= Jens Birkholm =

Danish painter (1869–1915)

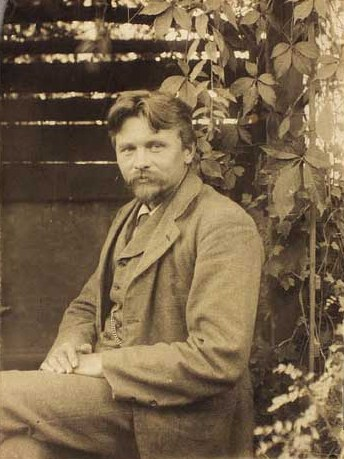
Jens Birkholm (date unknown)

Jens Birkholm (21 November 1869 – 11 May 1915) was a Danish genre painter associated with the group known as the Funen Painters.

== Biography ==
Birkholm was born in and died in Faaborg. His father was a Sailing Master. Several of his friends were aspiring artists, including Johannes Larsen and Peter Hansen. Although his only formal training was an apprenticeship with an obscure local artist, he drew and painted together with them in his spare time and absorbed the influence of Kristian Zahrtmann, who was their teacher in Copenhagen.

He was a pacifist so, to avoid military service, he worked as a travelling companion for visitors to Switzerland and Germany, where he also found work as a painter. While in Germany, he came in contact with the Social Democrats and, in 1892, settled in Berlin, where he created paintings of poor people in times of distress, some of them done in homeless shelters. Later, these would come to be considered his most important works.

In 1902, he contracted tuberculosis and returned to his home town where he participated in creating the Faaborg Museum. Under the influence of the Funen Painters, his style changed from social realism to impressionism and he shifted to painting mainly landscapes. He maintained an interest in social issues, however, and was often at odds with Faaborg's conservative government.

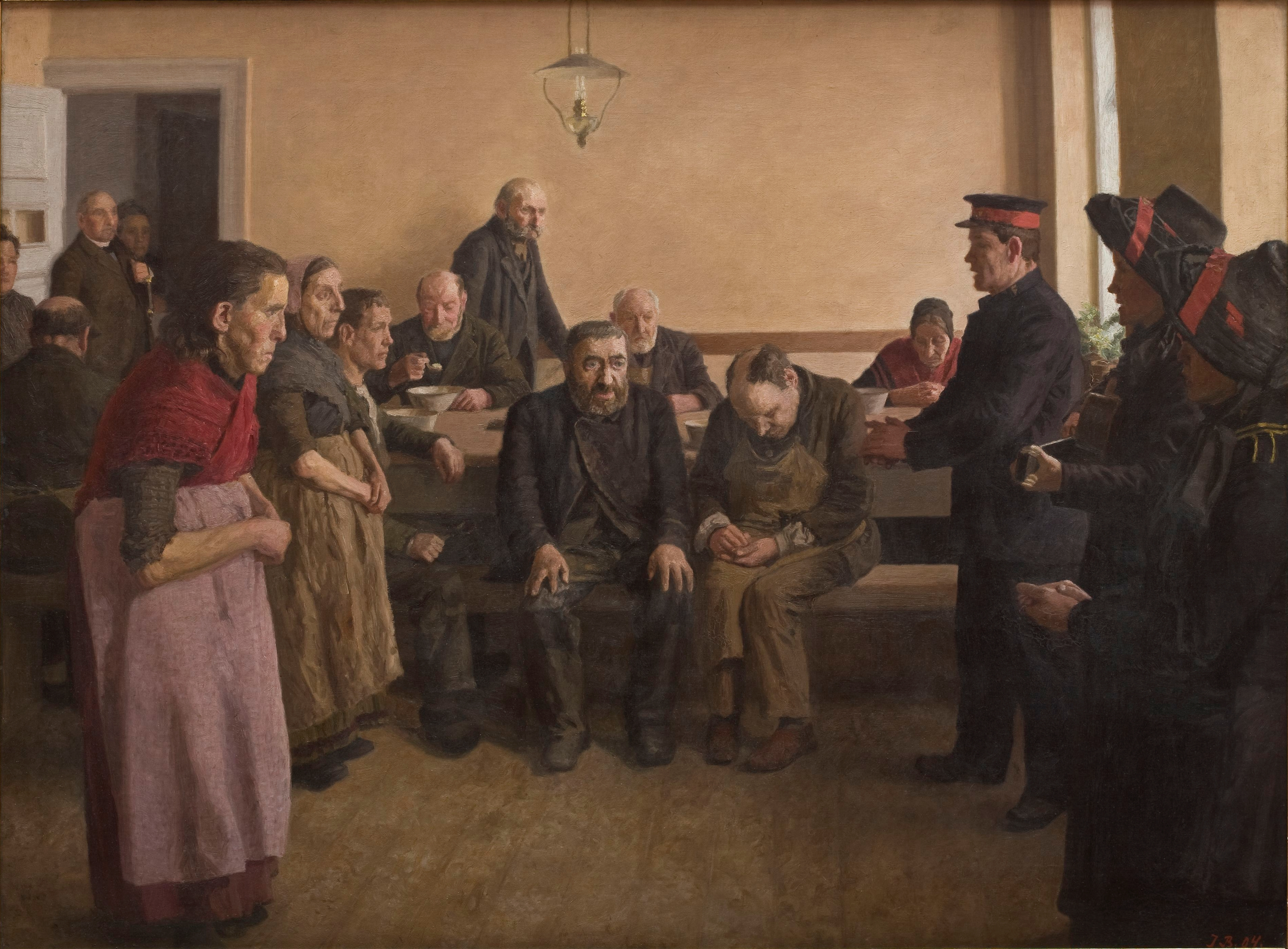
The Salvation Army at the Poorhouse

In 1906 he returned to Berlin, where he revisited the shelters, asylums, and orphanages and created paintings with new characters in his new style. From 1904 to 1912, he held annual exhibitions in Faaborg and made several trips abroad, including Italy (1905) and Tunisia (1911).

He became seriously ill in 1914 and spent almost a year in a sanatorium. The following year, he succumbed to his illness at the age of forty-six.
