= Alhed Larsen =

Danish painter (1872–1927)

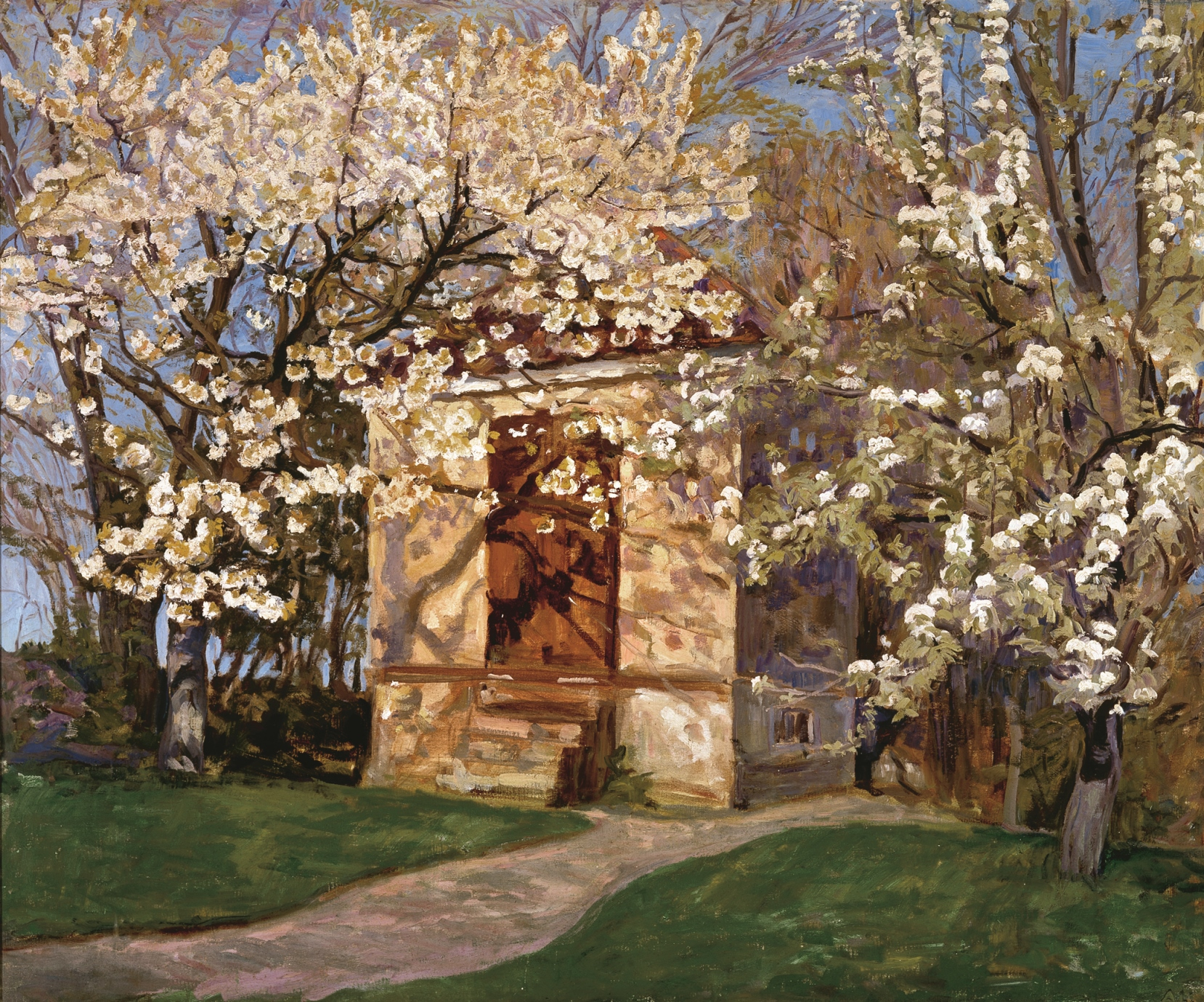
Havehuset med blomstrende kirsebær (before 1927).

Alhed Maria Larsen née Warberg (7 April 1872, in Heden near Faaborg – 31 August 1927, in Odense), the wife of Johannes Larsen, was one of the Fynboerne or "Funen Artists" who lived and worked on the Danish island of Funen. She appears to have been a central figure for the Funen Painters, frequently acting as hostess.

== Biography ==
Alhed Larsen was the daughter of Albrecht Christoffer Warberg, who managed the Erikshåb estate in the south of Funen. The estate became an early meeting place for the artists who later became known as the Fynboerne. As early as 1885, Larsen began to have painting lessons with Fritz Syberg and she became a friend of Johannes Larsen, whom she married in 1898, and of Peter Hansen. Anna Syberg, Hansen's sister, Marie Schou and Christine Swane, Johannes Larsen's sister, became lifelong companions.

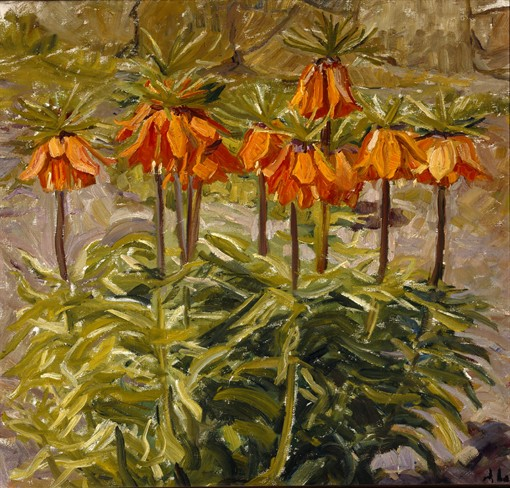
Ahled Larsen: Kejserkroner (1910).

Alhed Larsen had also had drawing lessons from her uncle Ludvig Brandstrup with whom she stayed in Copenhagen where she worked as a porcelain decorator at the Royal Copenhagen factory from 1890 to 1893. When she finally married Johannes Larsen in 1898, the couple moved to Kerteminde in north-east Funen where they soon built their new home, Møllebakken, on the outskirts of the town. The house was extended on several occasions, becoming one of the most beautiful artists' homes in the country. With its 16 bedrooms, it served as a central meeting place for the Funen Painters and their friends, in the caring hands of Alhed Larsen.

== Artwork ==
Side-by-side with her role as a mother and hostess, Larsen still found time to paint. From 1900 to 1906, she exhibited five times at the Charlottenborg Spring Exhibition held at the Charlottenborg Palace. With her husband, she went on study tours to Paris (1904) and the United States where she spent six months with her family in 1904. When the Faaborg Museum was opened for the Funen Painters in 1910, Larsen and the other women received little attention being treated as amateur "flower painters" by members of the acquisitions committee. In 1912, the women put on their own exhibition at Den Frie Udstilling.

Larsen's subjects were principally flowers, interiors and window views. The colours are rather dark in her early work but she later depicted sunlight shining on her flower arrangements and window scenes. In 1917, she and her husband each had their own studios at Møllebakken next to the winter garden where she was able to develop her painting with more intense colour, sometimes in pastel. In the 1920s, her health deteriorated but she continued to paint, ever more impressionistically, until her death in 1927. After her death, her husband ensured that her work was properly represented in the newly founded Kerteminde Museum.
