= Harald Leth =

Danish painter

Harald Leth (5 January 1899 in Copenhagen – 14 March 1986 in Ålsgårde) was a Danish painter whose Naturalistic work was inspired by Johannes Larsen of the Funen Painters and Oluf Høst of the Bornholm School.

== Biography ==
After first studying medicine, Leth spent a few months with Johannes Larsen at Kerteminde in 1921 before attending Harald Giersing's painting school (1921–1923). He was also taught by Olaf Rude (1923–1924) and for a short time by P. Rostrup Boyesen. He exhibited at the Charlottenborg autumn exhibition in 1923. He was a member of Høstudstillingen (1934–1944), Koloristerne (1946–1950) and Martsudstillingen (1951–1982).

== Artwork ==
During his summers on the island of Bornholm in the 1920s, Leth became acquainted with Oluf Høst and was later influenced by the work of Jean-Baptiste-Camille Corot and by Johan Lundbye and Theodor Philipsen, developing his own intensively Naturalistic style. He mainly painted landscapes, animals, still lifes and interiors, often in small formats. From 1944, when he moved to Asminderød Mark in the north of Zealand, he painted in an increasingly Colouristic style. Many of his paintings can be seen in the Statens Museum for Kunst and at the Louisiana Museum of Modern Art.

== Awards ==
Leth was awarded the Eckersberg Medal in 1958, the Thorvaldsen Medal in 1966 and the Prince Eugen Medal in 1983.

== Selected works ==
The following works are in the collection of Statens Museum for Kunst:

- Vignet (1922)
- Græssende ko (1924)
- Fjorden ved Lemvig (1926)
- Græssende ko ved havet. Gudhjem (1928)
- Siddende nøgen model (1933)
- Ved Gudhjem. Marine med fartøjer (1935)
- Lillehammer. Februar. Tømmerslæder (1937)
- Bondeslagtning (1939)
- Liggende kalv i stald (1939)
- Hoved af en bondekone, mellem en kat, en kalv og en hane (1944)
- Landskab med mennesker og dyr (1945)
- Mand med heste. Solnedgang. Asminderød mark (1948)
- Nøgne træer. Grå forårsdag (1952)
- Solnedgang. Vinter (1953)
- Snelandskab i solskin (1954)
- Opstilling med røde tulipaner (ca 1960)
- Løven og Jupiter i opgang (1962)
- Fad med røde æbler (1967)
- Opstilling med kande, æbler og flaske (1968)
- Solnedgang sent på året (1968)
- Badende kvinder (1968)
- Køretøj i vinterskoven (1970-1979)
- Landskab ved kysten med liggende badepige (1975)
