= Kunstnernes Frie Studieskoler =

Former art school in Copenhagen, Denmark

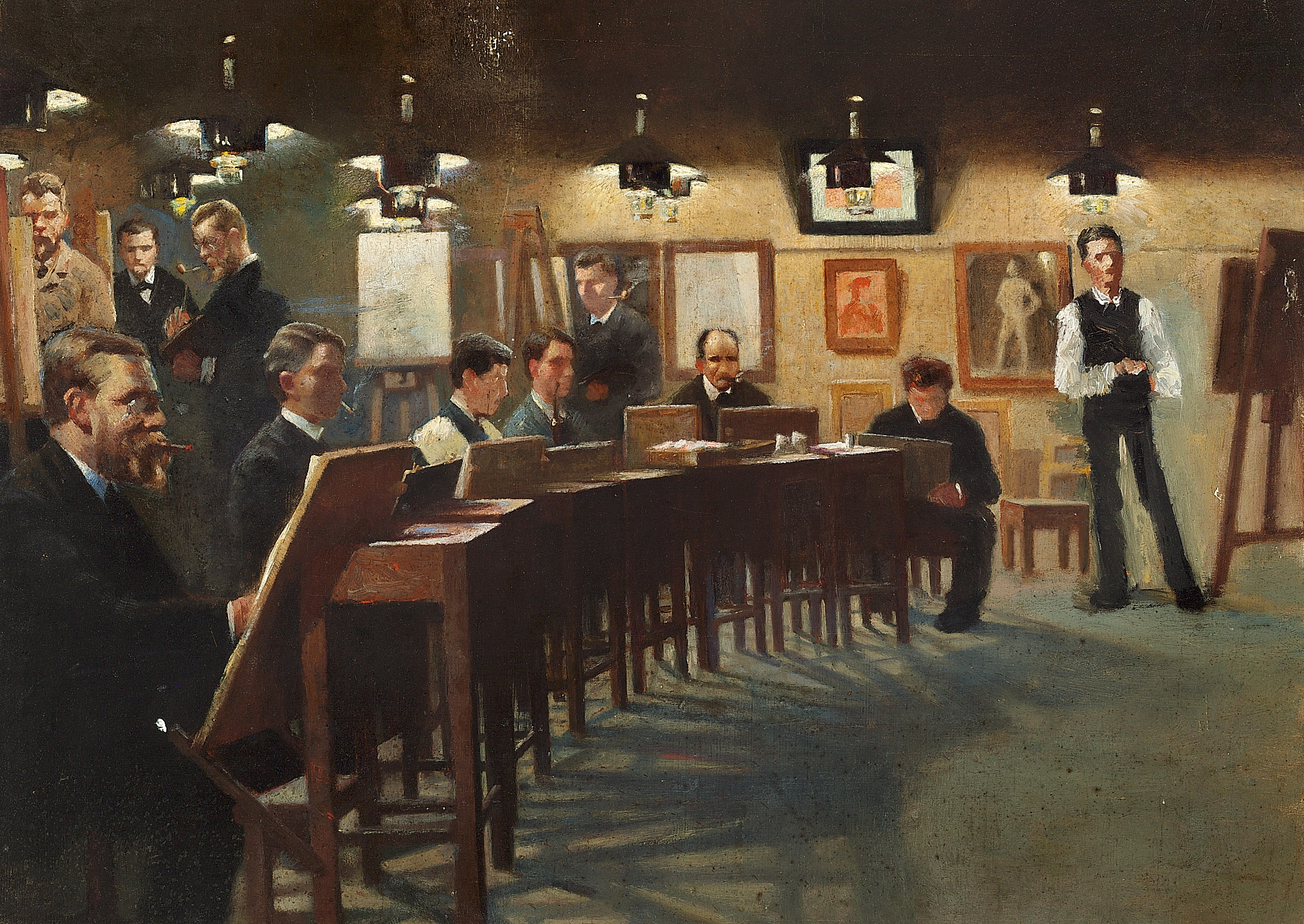
From Tuxen's school at Halmtorvet, painting by Johan Rohde, 1883

Kunstnernes Frie Studieskoler was an art school established in Copenhagen in 1882 as a protest against the policies of the Royal Danish Academy of Fine Arts and to provide an alternative to its educational program. It existed until 1912 and was a central institution of the Modern Breakthrough in Danish art.

== History ==
=== Foundation of the new school ===
From its foundation in 1754, the Royal Danish Academy of Fine Arts exercised a dominating role in the education of artists in Denmark. During the first half of the 19th century, with Christoffer Wilhelm Eckersberg as the central figure, the institution was the basis of what has become known as the Golden Age of Danish Painting. Another major influence at the academy was professor Niels Laurits Høyen who advocated a nationalistic approach to art.

Gradually the legacy from Eckersberg, who died in 1854, and Høyen's demand for nationalistic art became an obstacle deterring the assimilation of new trends from abroad and creating a vacuum in Danish art which lasted until the early 1880s.

Kunstnernes Frie Studieskoler was founded in 1882, at the initiative of a group of dissatisfied students from the Royal Academy of Fine Arts, as a reaction to the outdated teachings at the Academy. Laurits Tuxen became the school's first director and Peder Severin Krøyer one of its teachers.

=== Zahrtmann's school ===
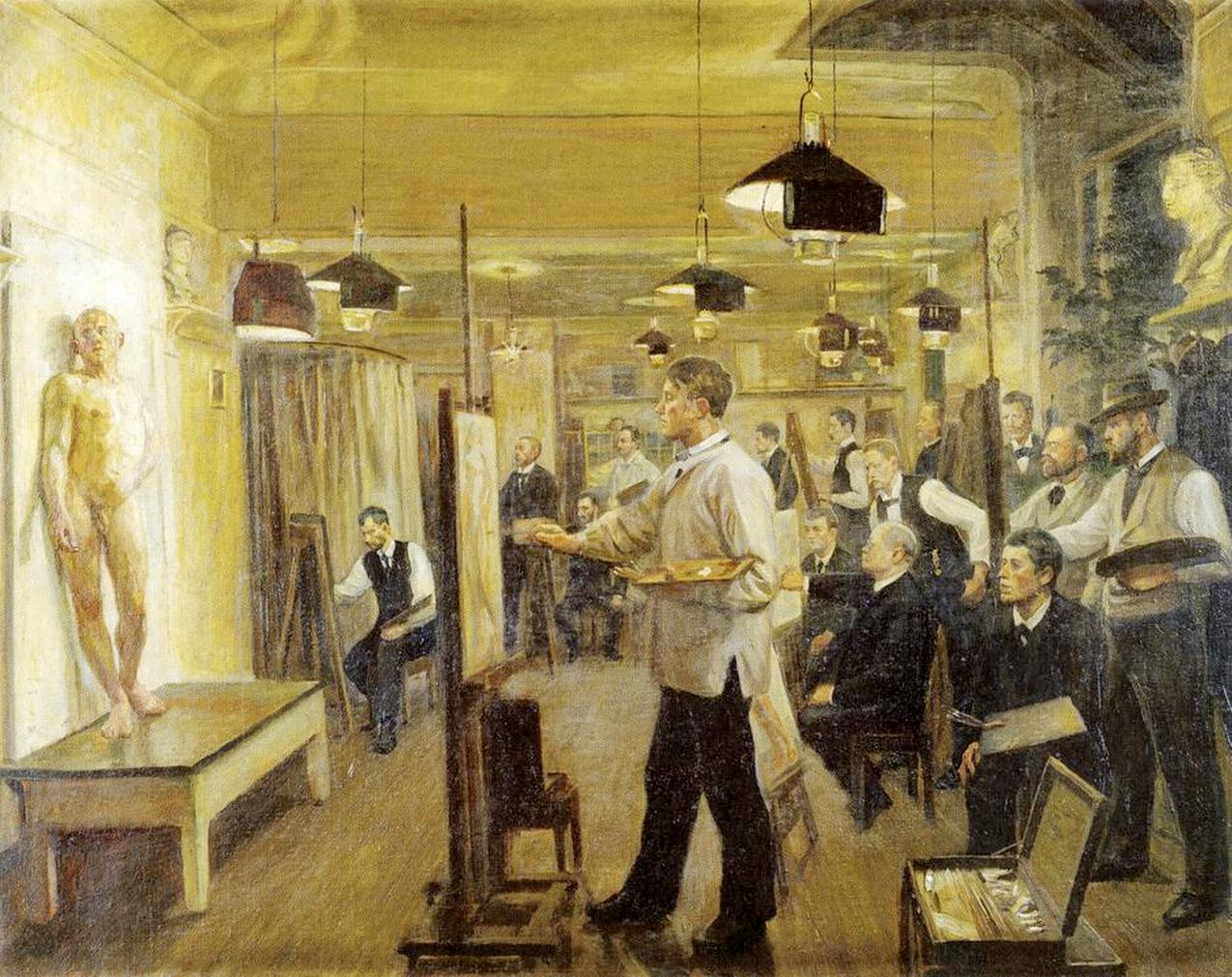
Poul C. Christensen: Zahrtmann's Painting School, 1899

In 1884 a preparatory class was added. It was first led by Frans Schwartz but in 1885 Kristian Zahrtmann became the head and under him it developed into an independent department.

While Tuxen and Krøyer's teachings were inspired by Léon Bonnat's school in Paris, where they had both been students, Zahrtmann encouraged his students to study classical art. In spite of this, Zahrtmann's school became even more avant garde and innovative, due to his calls for radical experiments and strong use of colours.

Johan Rohde, who had himself attended the school and had been among the original founders, took over after Zahrtmann and led the school until its closure in 1912.

== Students ==
Zahrtmann's school was of central importance to the group of painters who became known as Fynboerne due to their attachment to the island Funen. His students included Peter Hansen, Fritz Syberg, Poul S. Christiansen, Johannes Larsen and Oluf Hartmann; and modern painters Karl Isakson; Edvard Weie, Harald Giersing and Olaf Rude.
