= Funen Painters =

Group of Danish artists

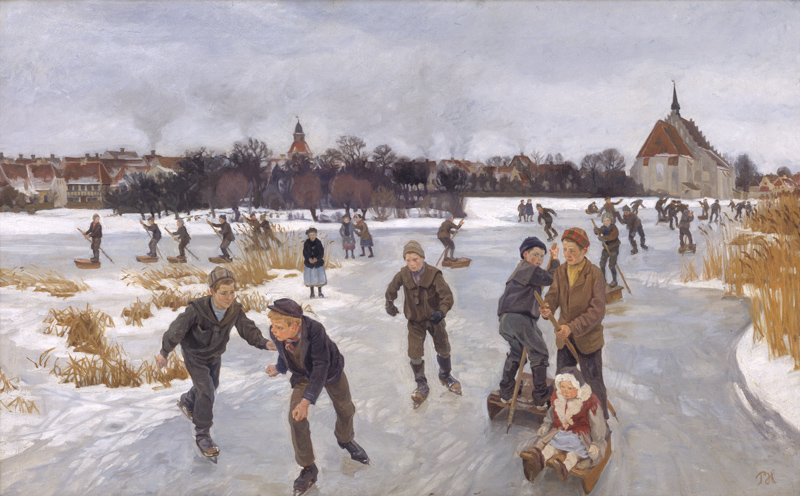
Peter Hansen: På isen bag byen Fåborg (1901)

The Funen Painters or Fynboerne were a loose group of Danish artists who formed an art colony on the island of Funen at the very beginning of the 20th century. They were strongly influenced by Kristian Zahrtmann who taught at the Artists Studio School in Copenhagen from 1885 to 1908. Like Zahrtmann, they abandoned the traditions of the Danish Academy and ventured into Naturalism and Realism.

== History ==
The close-knit core members of the group were Johannes Larsen (1867–1961) from Kerteminde in the northeastern corner of Funen and Fritz Syberg and Peter Hansen, both from the southern port of Faaborg. Alhed Larsen, Larsen's wife, Anna Syberg, Hansen's sister and Syberg's wife, and Christine Larsen, Larsen's younger sister, all of whom were artists, were also deeply associated with the group although they did not receive the same level of recognition as the men. Christine married Sigurd Swane who also moved to Kerteminde to establish their family home.

Møllebakken, also near Kerteminde, became the home of Johannes and Alhed Larsen and soon developed into a meeting place for the Funen Artists at the beginning of the 20th century. They were joined by Harald Giersing, who married Syberg's sister Besse, and other young artists including Olaf Rude, Harald Leth and Sven Havsteen-Mikkelsen who came to Møllebakken for inspiration.

Another artist associated with the group was Poul S. Christiansen who came from the north of Funen and became a close friend of Zahrtmann after he joined his school in 1885. It was there that he met Johannes Larsen.

As a result of their paintings of everyday country life, the Funen Painters were sometimes disparagingly called bondemalerne or the peasant painters. In 1907, there was a heated debate in the Danish press between Gudmund Hentze and Harald Slott-Møller and his wife, who stood up for the more intellectually oriented cultural movement in Copenhagen, and Peter Hansen who defended the Funen Painters together with Jens Birkholm, Poul S. Christiansen and Karl Schou.

== Similarities and differences ==
The three main artists among the Funen Painters had much in common. They had all studied under Kristian Zahrtmann and were later all strongly influenced by Theodor Philipsen whose approach to outdoor painting and use of light and shade was often reflected in their work. As in Philipsen's artwork, the influence of Paul Gauguin and Impressionism can also be seen in their paintings. Zahrtmann had however encouraged the artists to develop their own style although all three emulated his use of strong colour. Indeed, Johannes Larsen refused to be identified with a so-called "Funen School", preferring to ascribe their relationship to a common background and their close friendship.

== Museums ==
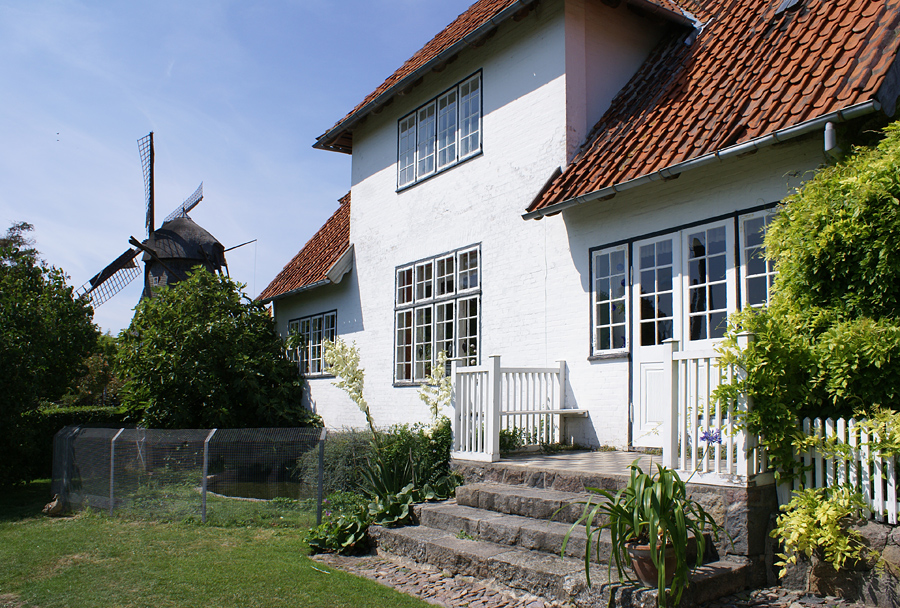
Johannes Larsen Museum in Kerteminde

- The Johannes Larsen Museum on Møllebakken near Kerteminde is the former home of the artist and his wife Alhed. Many of their own paintings as well as those of the other Funen Painters including Fritz Syberg, Peter Hansen and Christine Swane can be seen there in surroundings which have been little altered since the colony met there at the beginning of the 20th century.
- The Faaborg Museum in the harbour town of Faaborg on Funen's southern coast is also closely associated with the Funen Painters, especially Fritz Syberg and Peter Hansen who grew up in the town. The museum puts on special exhibitions of the Funen Painters' works.

== Gallery ==
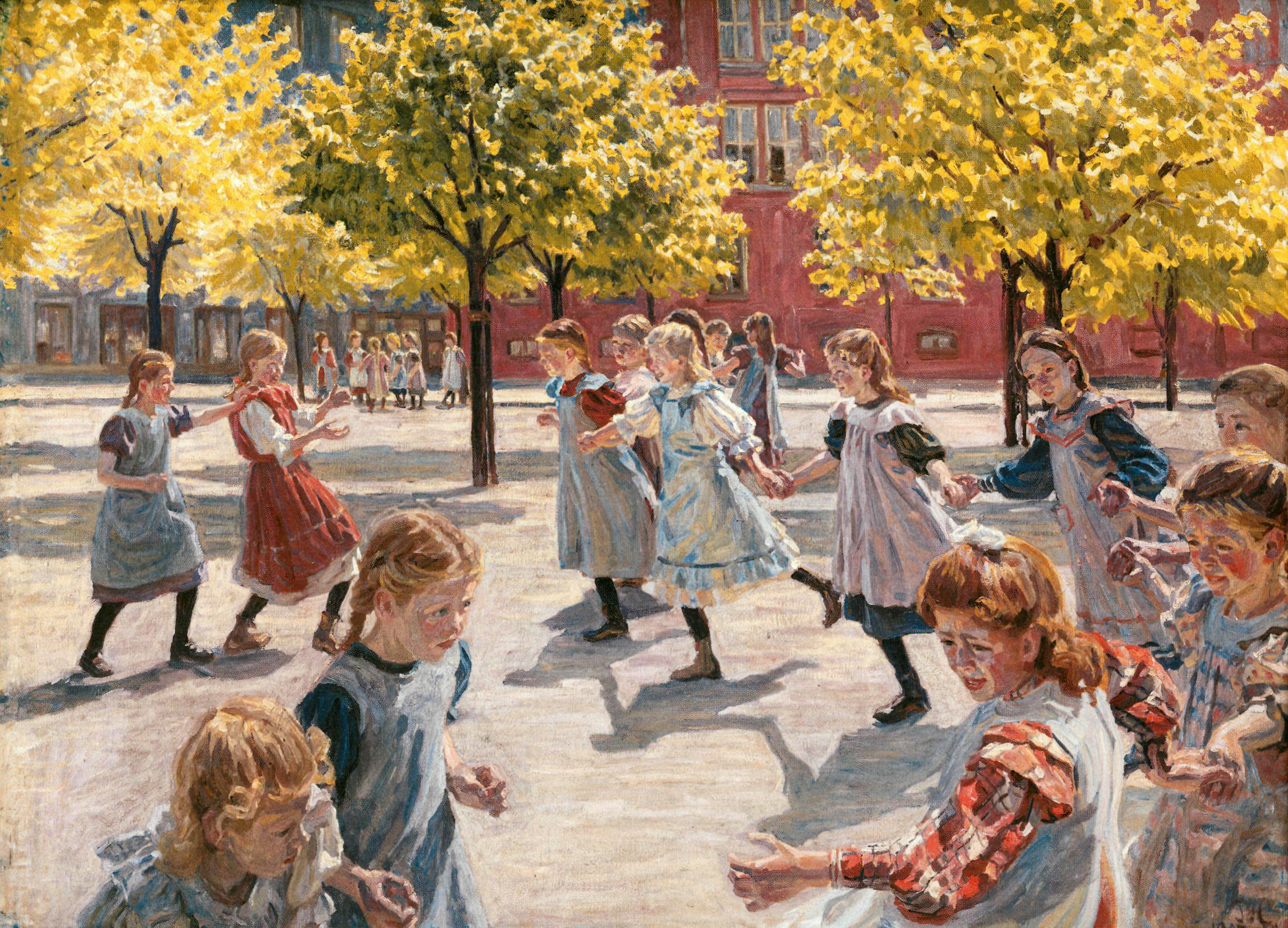
Peter Hansen: Legende børn. Enghave plads (1908)

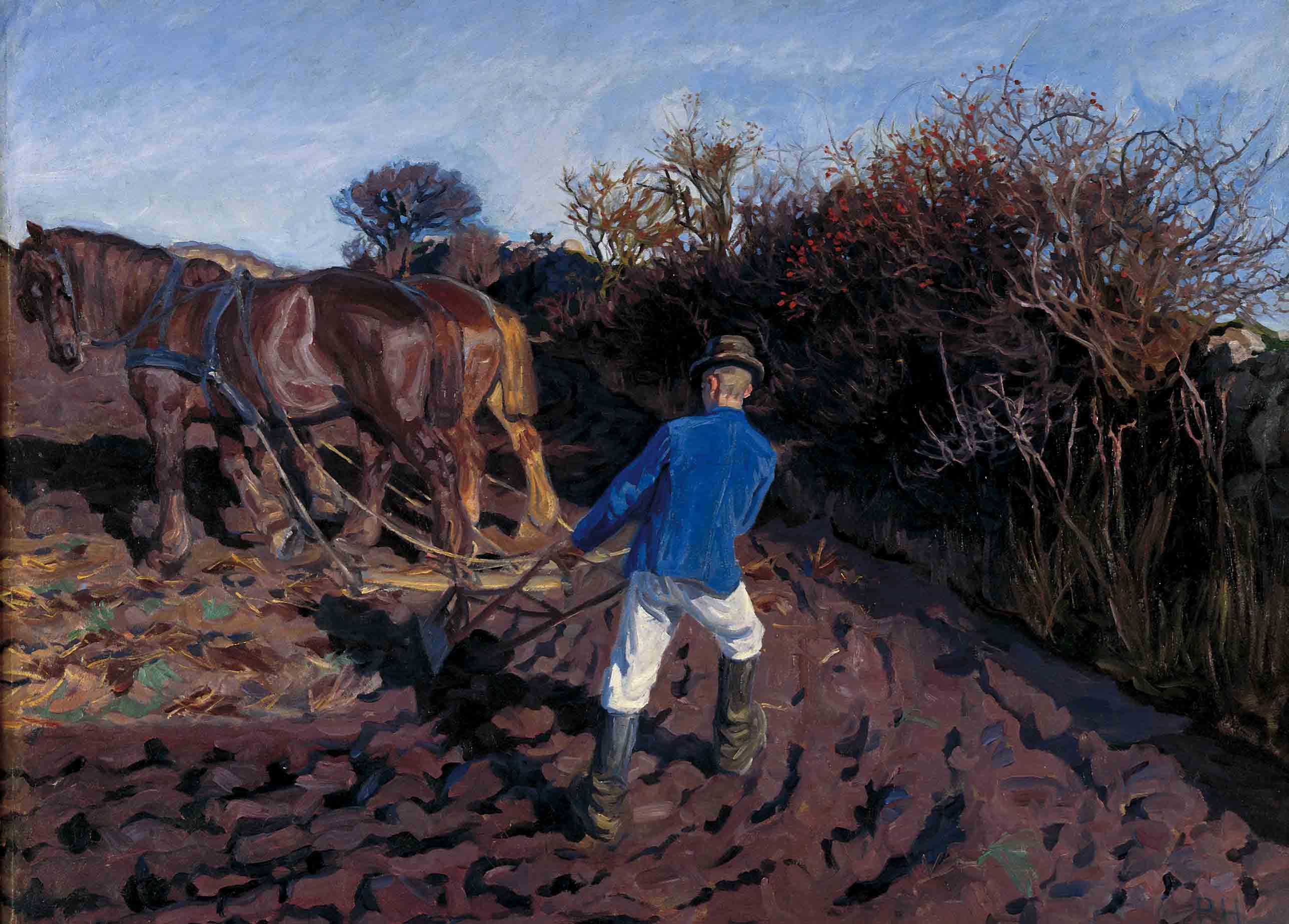
Peter Hansen: Pløjemanden vender (1902)

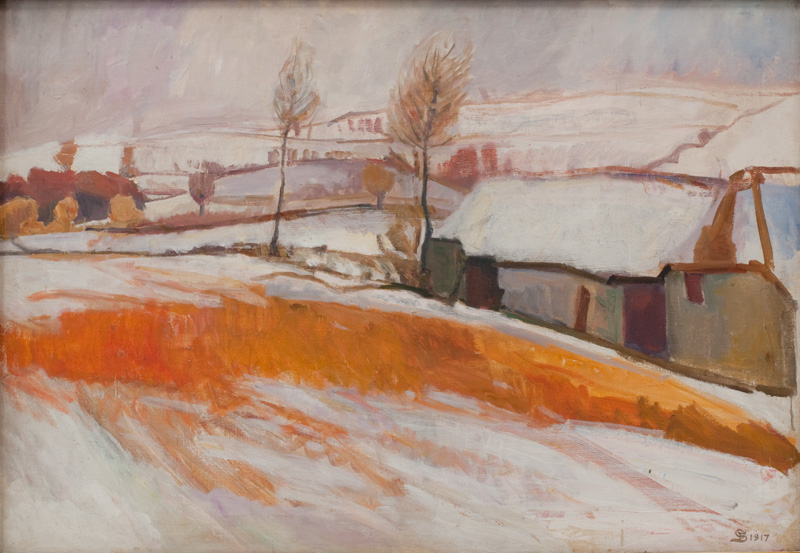
Fritz Syberg: Overkærby Bakke. Vinter (1917)

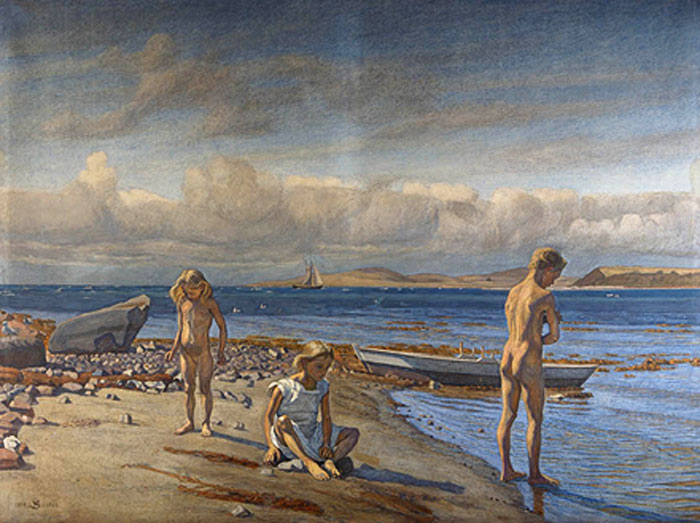
Fritz Syberg: Børnene på Fyns Hoved (1905)

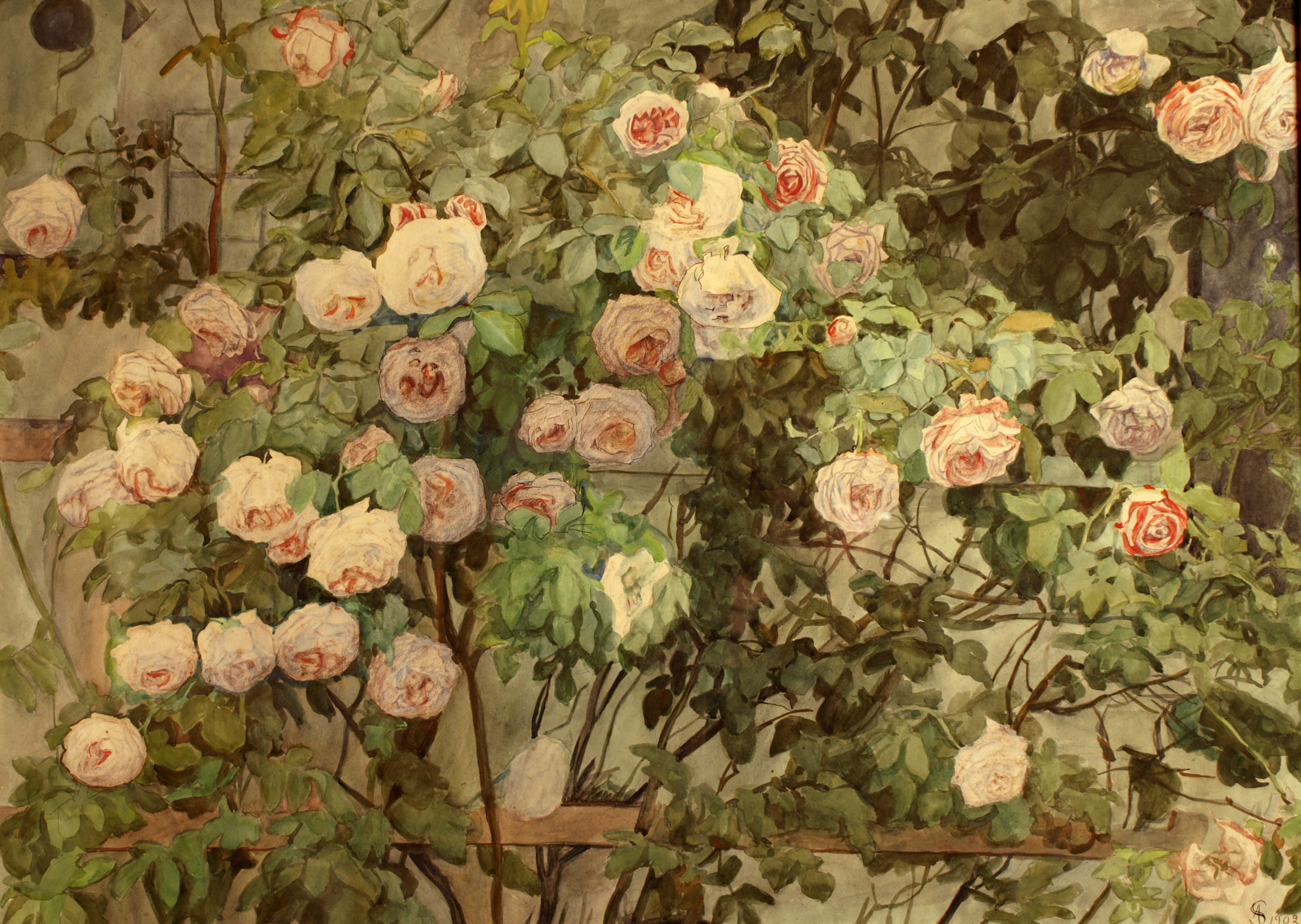
Anna Syberg: Roser (1902)

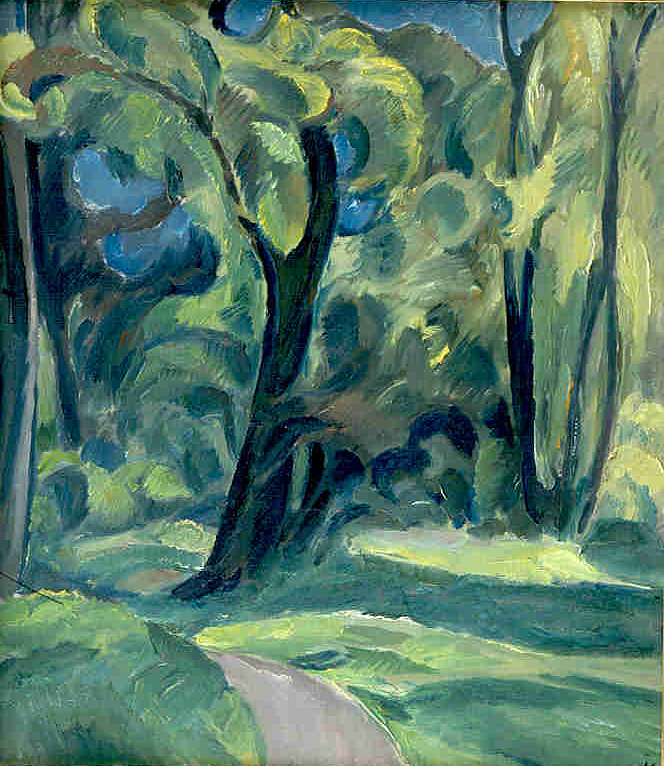
Harald Giersing: Skovinteriør. Sorø (c. 1915)

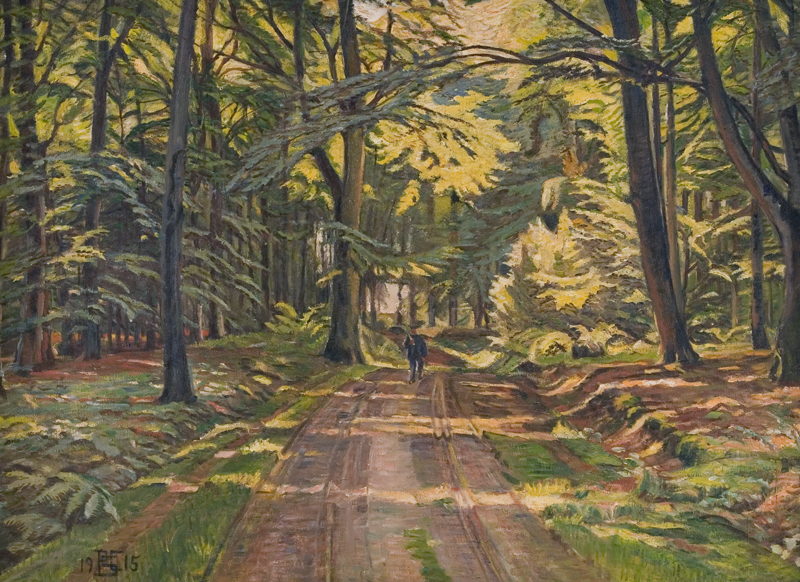
Poul S. Christiansen: Skovvej ved Dyrnæs (1915)

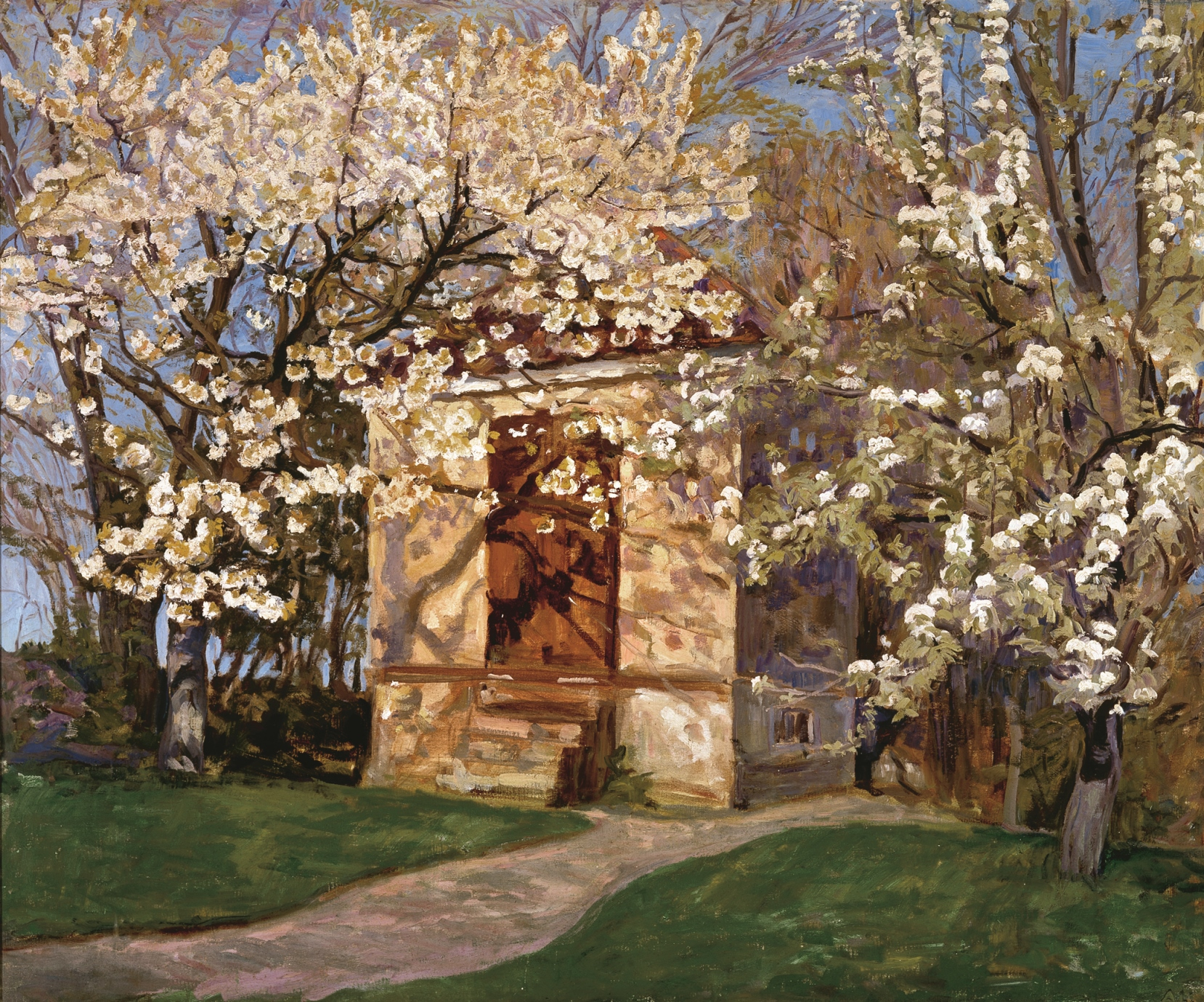
Alhed Larsen: Havhuset med blomstrende kirsebær (undated)

== See also ==
- Danish art
- Skagen Painters
- Bornholm school of painters
