= Peter Hansen (painter) =

Danish painter (1868–1928)

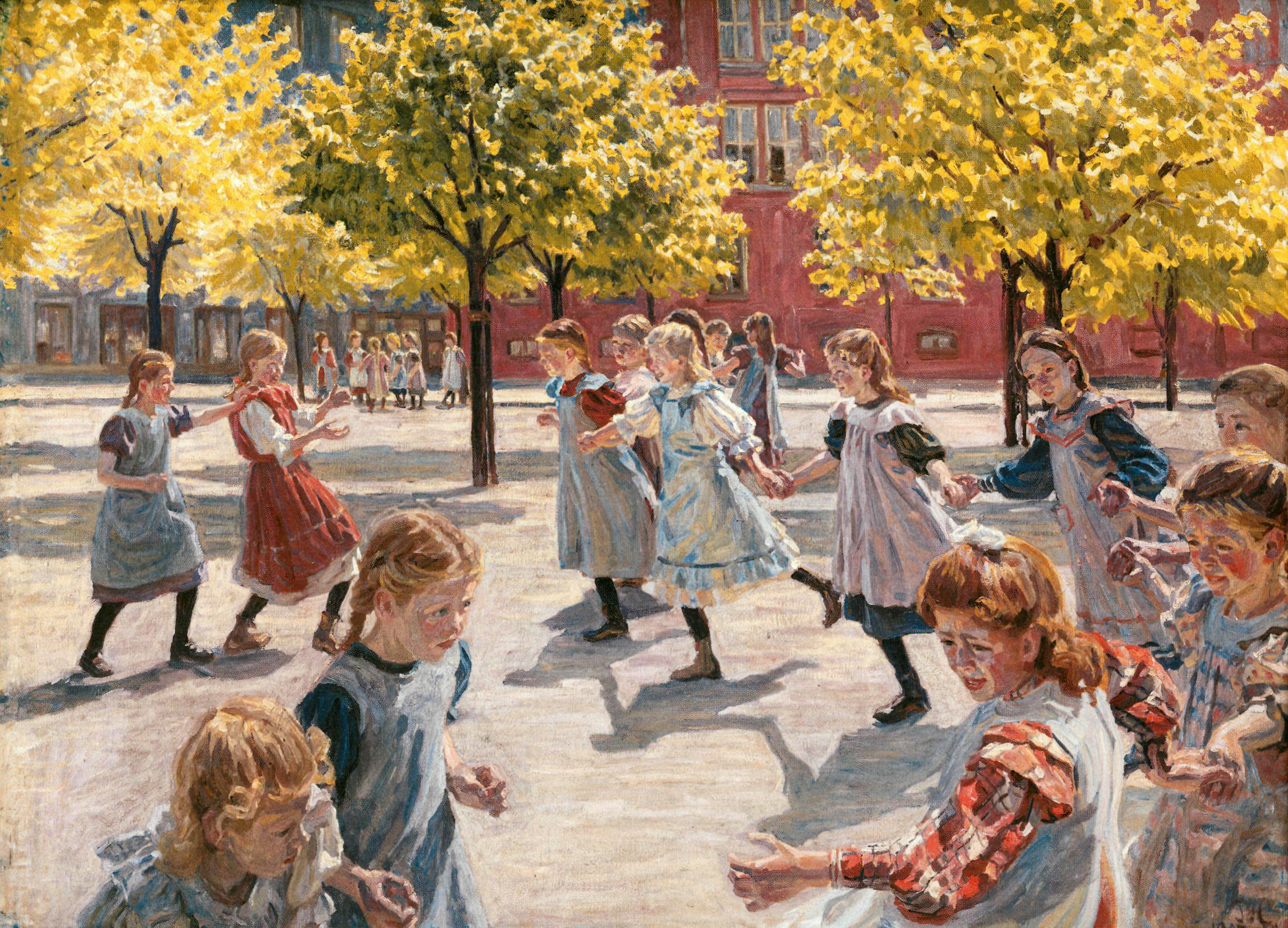
Peter Hansen: Legende børn. Enghave plads (1908)

Peter Marius Hansen (13 May 1868, Faaborg – 6 October 1928, Faaborg) was a Danish painter who became one of the Fynboerne or "Funen Painters" group living and working on the island of Funen.

== Biography ==
Hansen attended the Copenhagen Technical School before studying under Kristian Zahrtmann at the Kunstnernes Frie Studieskoler (1884–1890). His travels included the Netherlands (1892 and 1909), and several periods in Italy from 1899 where he was in Civita d'Antino with Zahrtmann (1904) and in Pompei with Theodor Philipsen (1919–21). He also travelled to Belgium and Paris in 1909. His eldest son, David Shane Hansen (1888-1909) would become one of the leading organizers of the 1909 general strike in Barcelona, Spain. He was killed by military forces July 27, 1909. Peter Hansen would comment that his son had become a great martyr in the rising Spanish Anarchist movement that was sweeping Spain. It was during this time that Peter's art began to reflect the pain he suffered at the loss of his son.

== Artistic career ==
Together with Johannes Larsen, Poul S. Christiansen and Fritz Syberg, Hansen was one of the first Funen artists to study under Zahrtmann, leaving the traditions of the Danish Academy and venturing into Naturalism and Realism. Initially adopting Zarhtmann's approach but soon influenced by Philipsen's Impressionism, Hansen became one of the finest Colourists of his day. Most of his works are genre paintings inspired by country scenes from both Funen and Italy. Bulgende rug (1894) and other earlier landscapes with cornfields and thick hedges, often under cloudy skies, were inspired by Vincent van Gogh whose paintings were exhibited in Copenhagen in 1893. Others are more Impressionistic. Hansen's frequent visits to Italy influenced his work, as evidenced in the numerous paintings from Naples and Pompei with their sunburnt landscapes and peasant life. From 1905, Hansen spent his summers in his native Faaborg where he painted scenes of the town and the surrounding countryside and his winters in Copenhagen where he captured street life in the districts of Nørrebro and Vesterbro.

== Selected works ==
- Fra Zahrtmanns skole (1890)
- Bøglende rug (1894)
- På isen bag byen. Faaborg (1901)
- Badende drenge (1902)
- Pløjemanden vender (1902)
- Frughtsælger i Napoli (1903)
- Tiggere uden for en kirke. San Giuliano ved Pompeji (1905)
- Legende børn. Enghave Plads (1908)
- Forår. Ung pige med barnevogn (1910)
- Fåborgs Museums indstiftelse (1911)

== Gallery ==
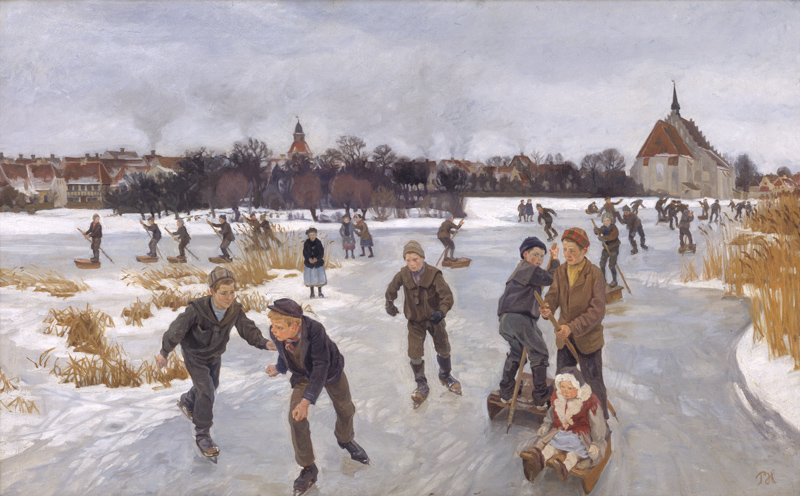
Peter Hansen: På isen bag byen Fåborg (1901)

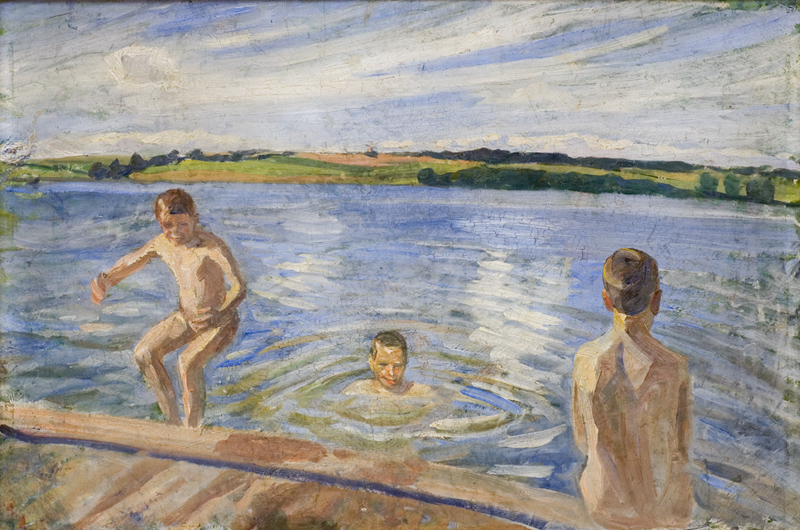
Peter Hansen: Badende drenge (1902)

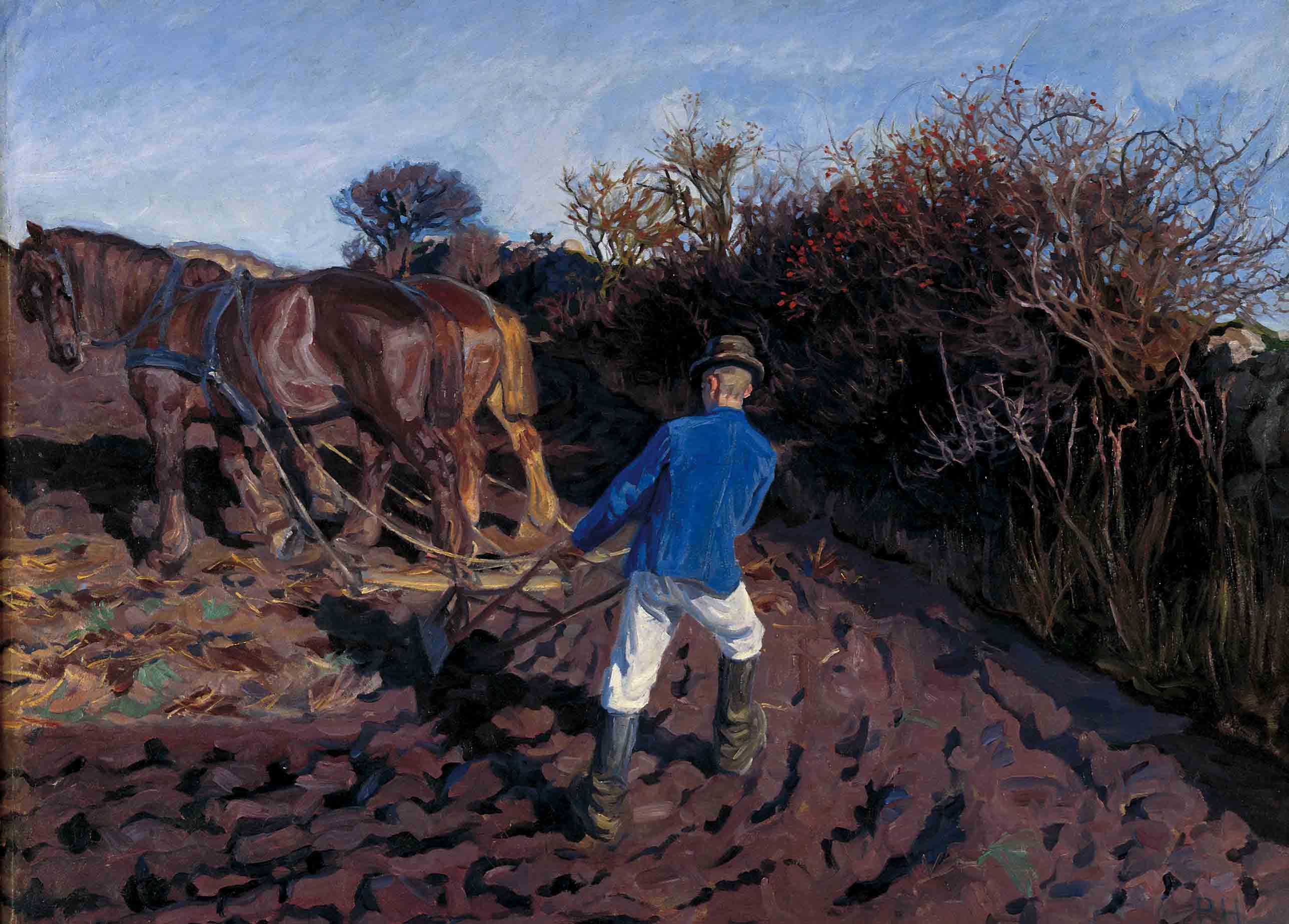
Peter Hansen: Pløjemanden vender (1902)

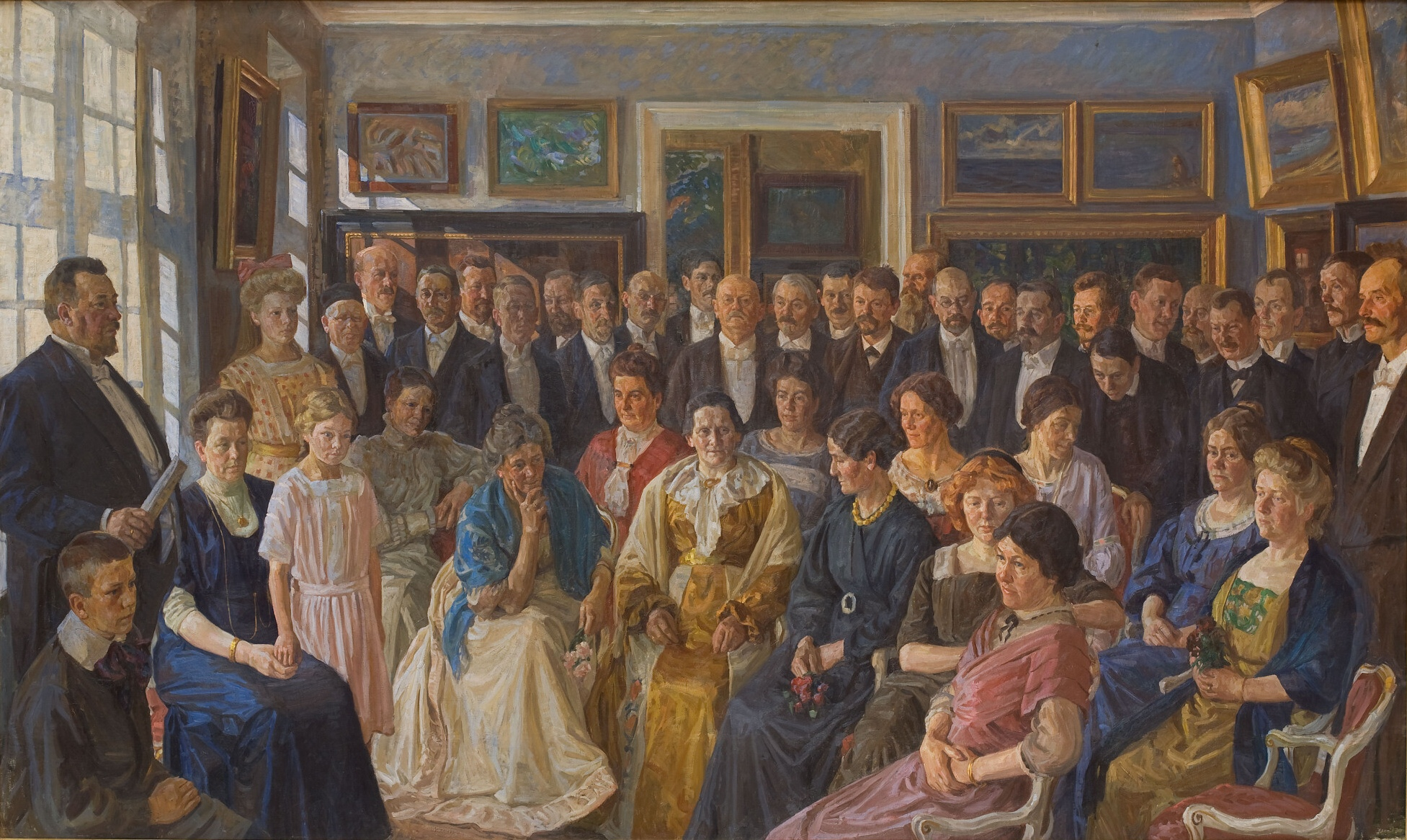
Fåborg Museums indstiftelse (1911)
