= Poul Simon Christiansen =

Danish painter

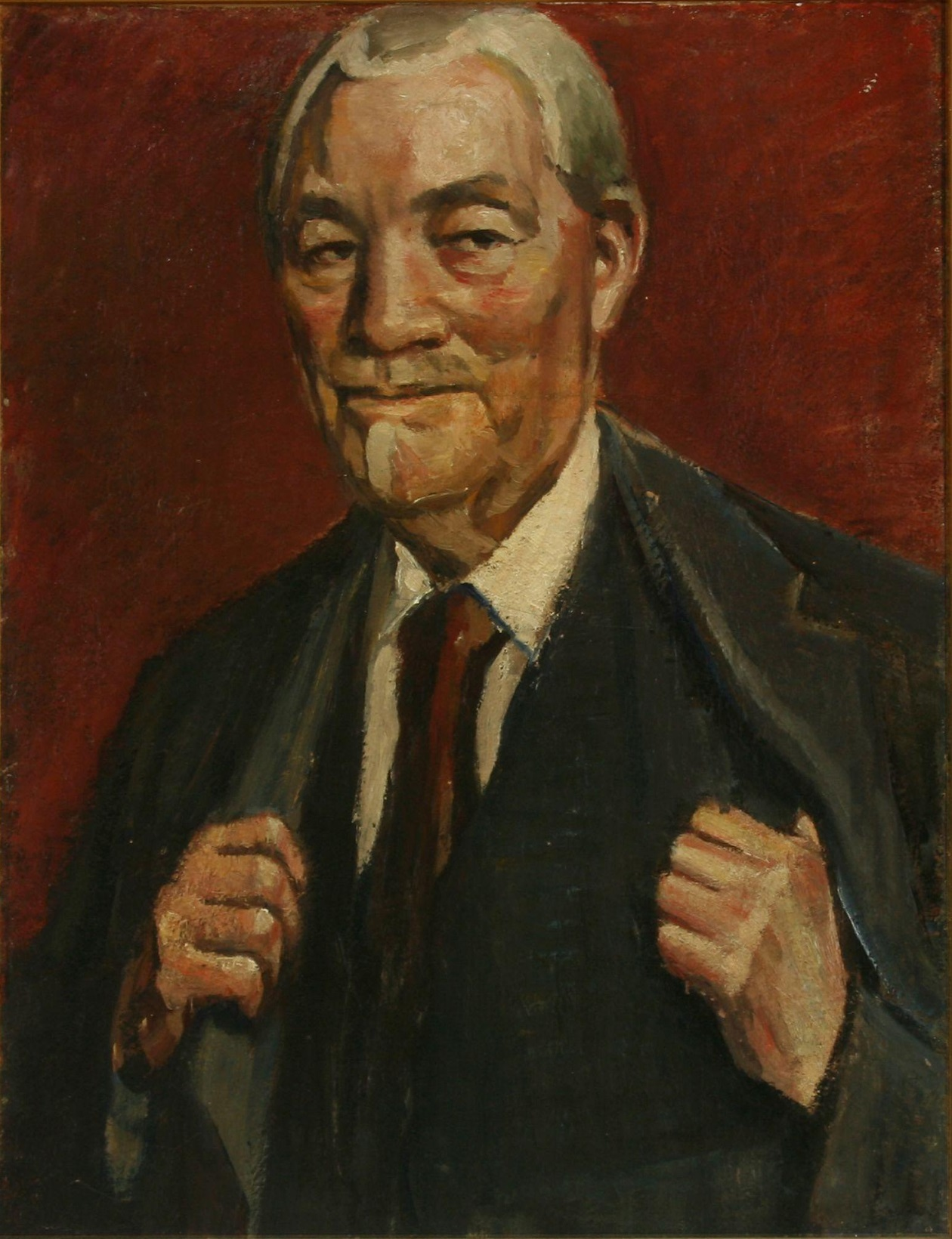
Poul S. Christiansen: Self-portrait

Poul Simon Christiansen, frequently referred to as Poul S. Christiansen (20 October 1855, Rolfsted, Funen – 14 November 1933, Copenhagen) was a Danish painter who developed a Colourist style under Kristian Zahrtmann and as a result of his appreciation of the works of Paul Gauguin and Vincent van Gogh. He painted landscapes and religious works, many of which became popular as reproductions.

== Biography ==
Trained by his father as a windmill builder, he studied art at Zahrtmann's Artists Studio School (1885–1890). He travelled to Italy on several occasions and stayed with Zahrtmann in Civita d'Antino. Despite his own rather Grudvigian approach, he was considered by the Funen Painters to be one of their own when they exhibited his works at the Faaborg Museum.

Christiansen met considerable opposition and it was only with Zahrtmann's support that he was able to exhibit at Den Frie Udstilling in 1895. However, he was not widely recognized until his works were exhibited retrospectively in 1910. He rather Grundvigian background led him to associate with the younger but more mature artists Joakim and Niels Skovgaard and with his old school friend Niels Larsen Stevns.

With his dedicated concern for detail and a feel for dramatic effect, Christiansen created monumental works with strong bright colours. Many of his works are drawn from the Bible, mythology, history and from Dante's Divine Comedy. His Dante pictures, inspired by Giotto and Bernardino Luini, reveal his Expressionistic use of colour, perhaps also influenced by his appreciation of paintings by Gauguin and Van Gogh which were exhibited in Copenhagen in 1893. His large classical paintings of Danish landscapes are comparable to those of P. C. Skovgaard.

Among his most notable paintings are Dante og Beatrice i paradiset (1893) and Knud den Store ved Havet (1908). From 1895, he was a member of Den Frie Udstilling and in 1923 was awarded the Thorvaldsen Medal.

== Selected works ==
Among Christiansen's most notable works are:

- Dante og Beatrice i paradiset (1893)
- Dante og Vergil ved helvedes port (1894)
- Kristi Opstandelse (1897)
- Englerne forkynder Kristi fødsel for hyrderne (altarpiece, 1897)
- Knud den store ved havet (1900)
- Landevej ved Karise (1907)
- Varm sommerdag i Tibirke Bakker (1910)
- Cività d'Antino i Abruzzerne (1911)
- Skovinteriør, Dyrnæs (1922)
- De kloge og de ukloge jomfruer (1924)

== Gallery ==
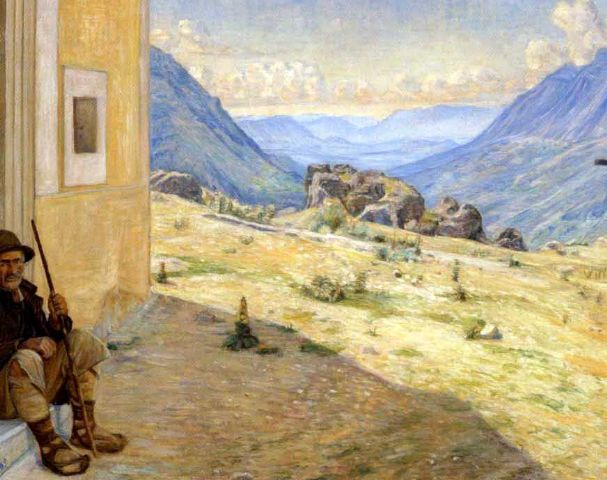
Poul S. Christiansen: Sydeuropæisk bjerglandskab med hyrde i forgrunden (1905)

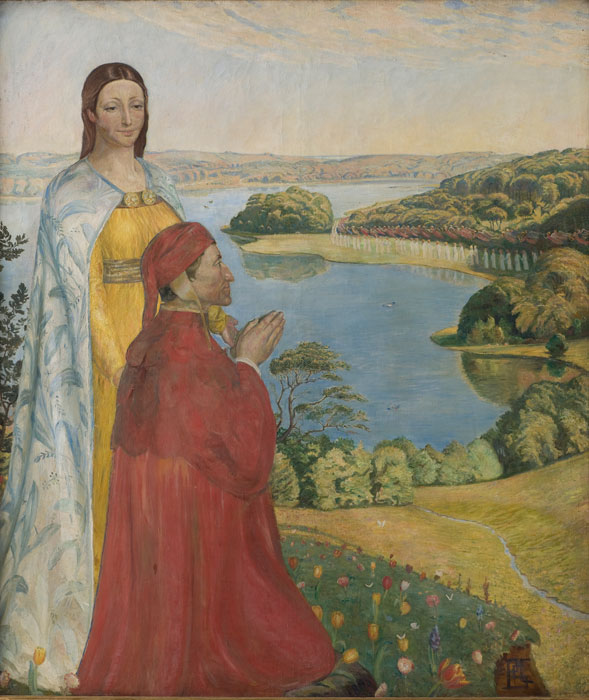
Poul S. Christiansen: Dante og Beatrice i paradiset (1895)

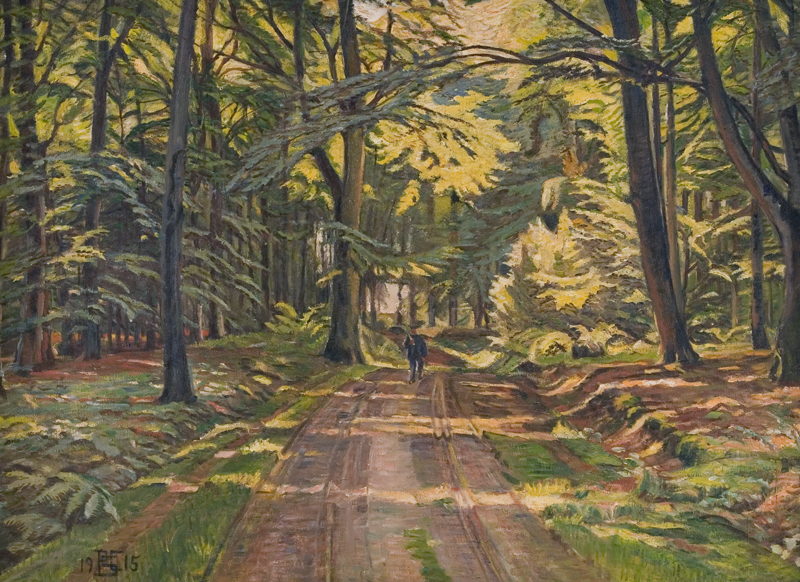
Poul S. Christensen: Skovvej ved Dyrnæs (1915)

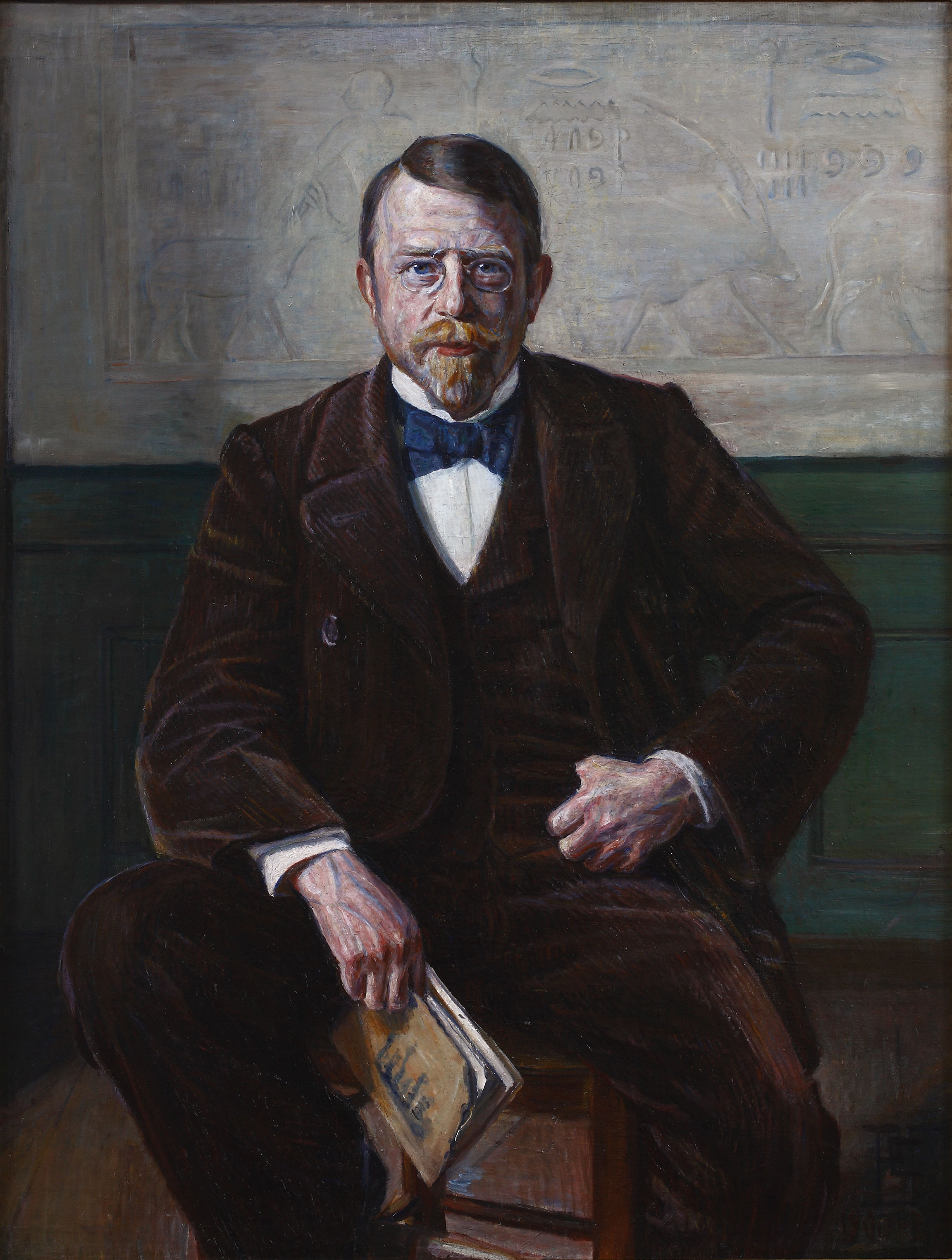
Poul S. christensen: Portrait of Johan Rhode (unknown date)
