= Imago Museum =

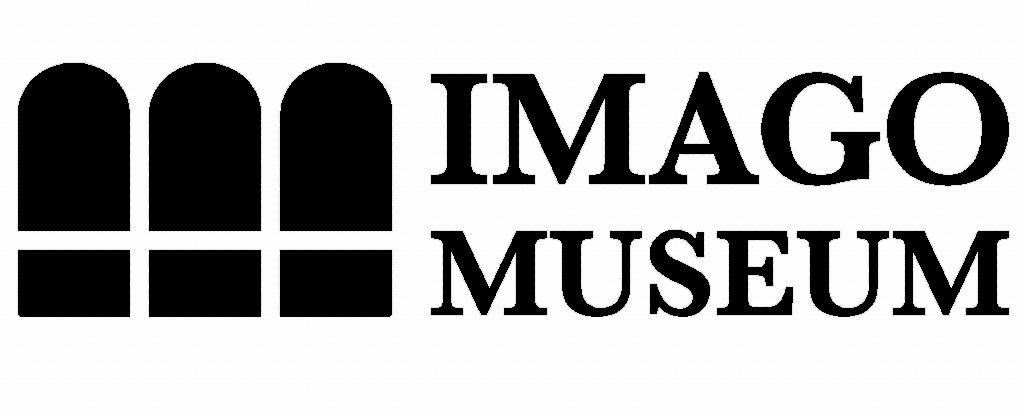

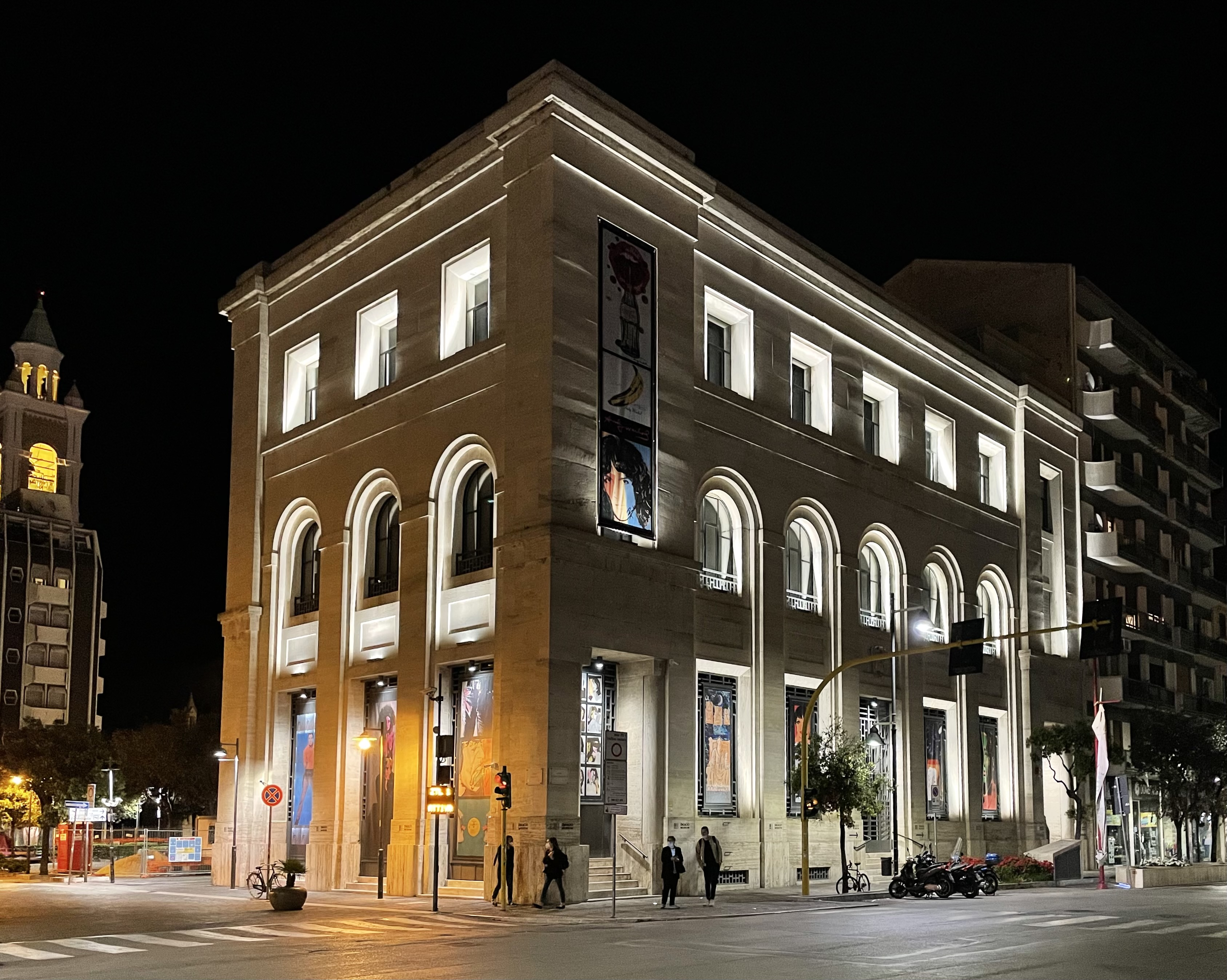
- Established: February 8, 2021
- Location: Corso Vittorio Emanuele II 270, Pescara, Italy
- Coordinates: 42.47002°N 14.20643°E
- Type: Art museum
- Founder: Fondazione Pescarabruzzo
- Website: imagomuseum.it

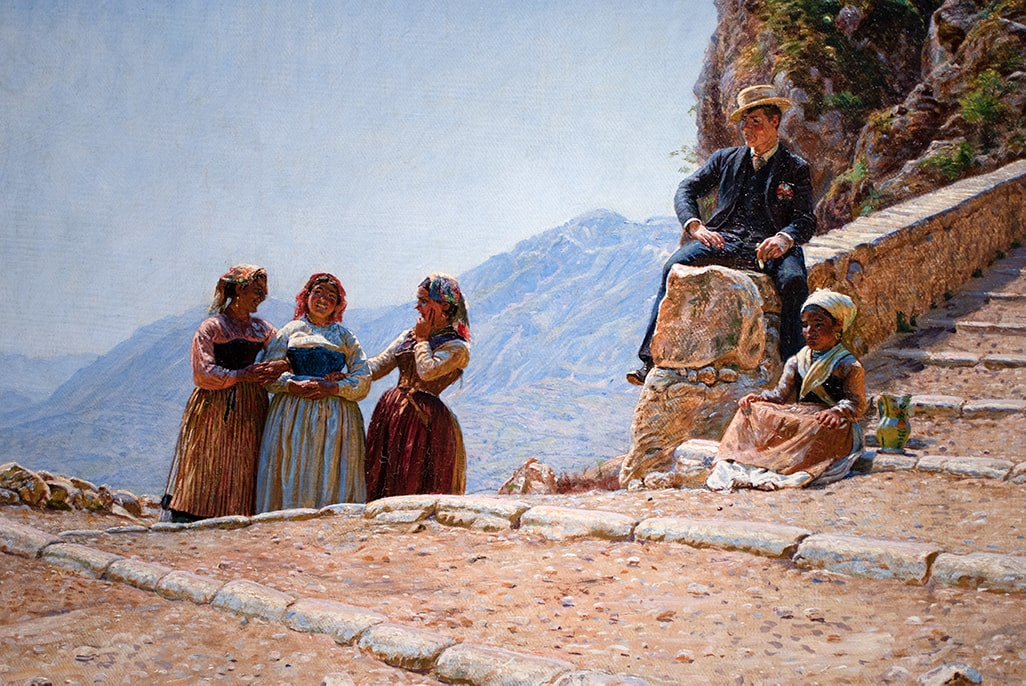
Kristian Zahrtmann, Stairway in Civita d'Antino, from 1889.

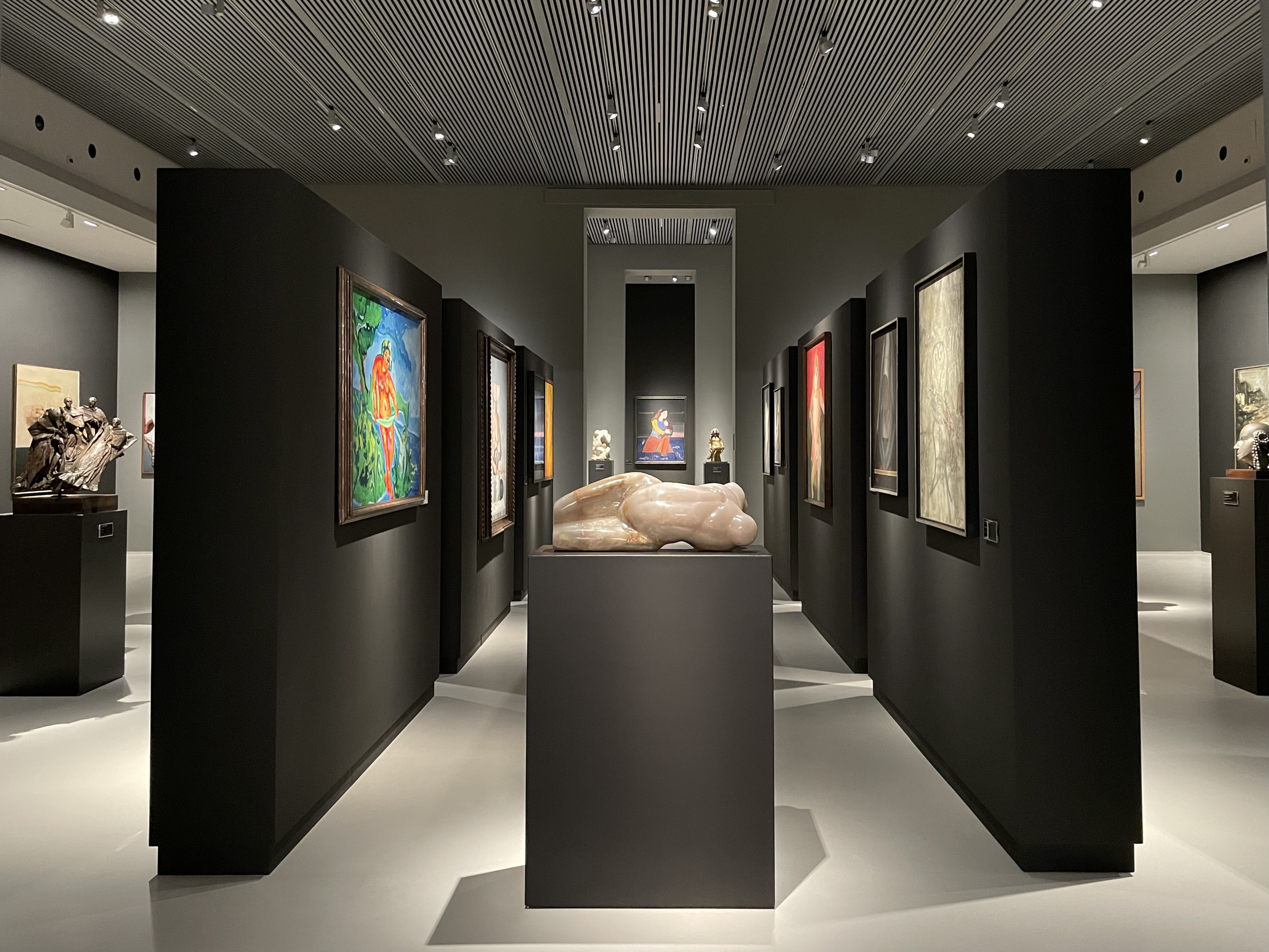
Piano B

Imago Museum is a modern and impressionist art museum in Pescara, Italy, inaugurated in 2021.

Commissioned by the Pescarabruzzo Foundation, a foundation of banking origin that represents the historical continuation of the Banca Caripe, the museum is located in the premises of the former city headquarters of the Banco di Napoli, a rationalist building with three levels, acquired by the institution in 2013.

== Description ==
Comprising about 1,200 m^{2}, the museum is based in the former Palazzo dell' Banco di Napoli, one of the prominent buildings of the city. Built in 1933 as a project by the engineer Camillo Guerra, the Palazzo is an example of rationalist architecture. Set with a rectangular plan, it presents on the external fronts arches with double ferrules and splayings on the windows; the total absence of decorative elements marks a clear sign of detachment from Art Nouveau architecture, prevalent in the city at the time.

In Piazza Sacro Cuore, behind the museum, the work "Le Fanciulle" by the Pescara artist Franco Summa was installed in May 2021, urban monuments of about 5 meters representing female features. The two statues are a posthumous work, also financed by the foundation that manages the museum.

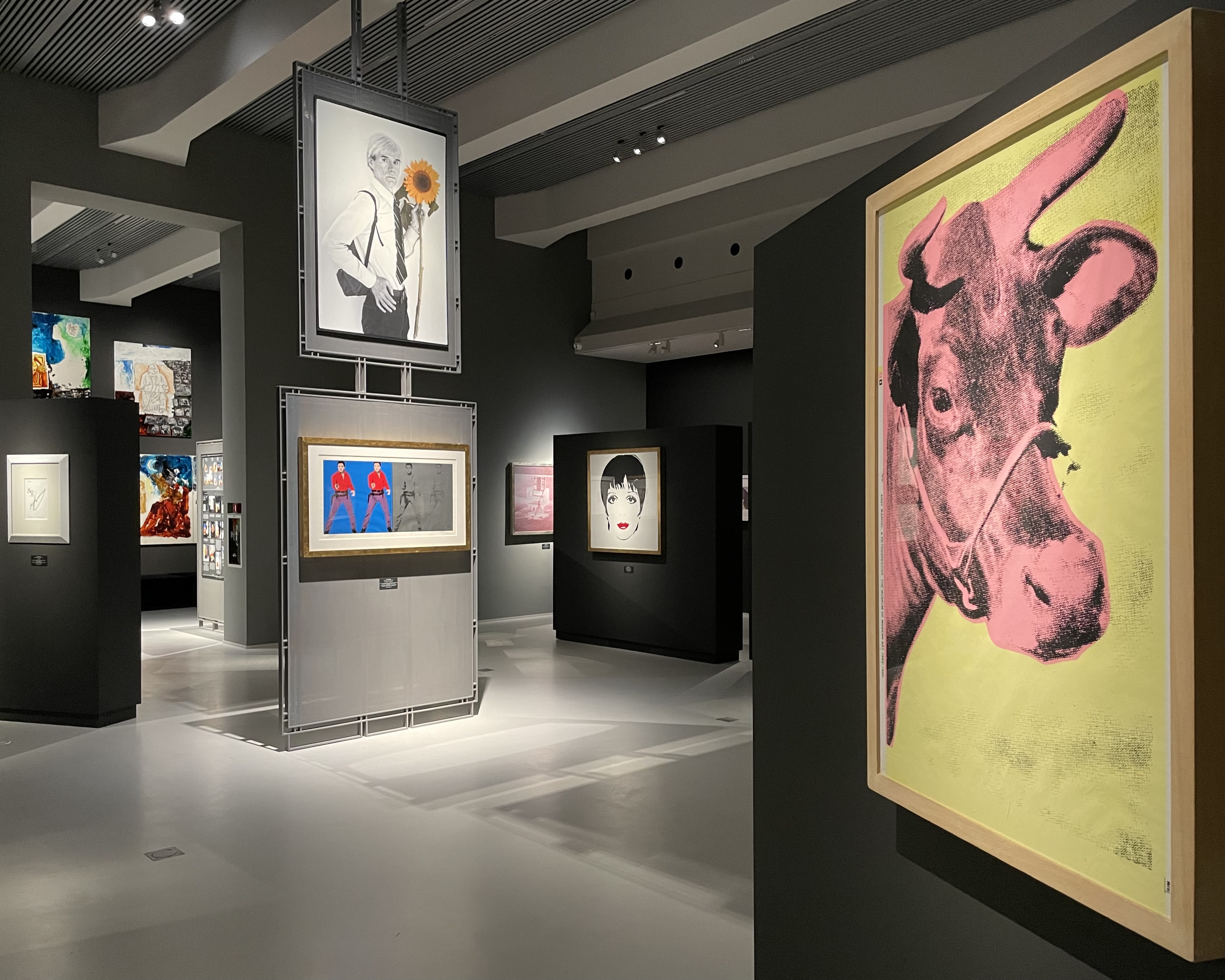
Warhol e Schifano tra Pop Art e Classicismo

== Collection ==
=== Scandinavian impressionists ===
The collection, launched in 2010 by the Pescarabruzzo Foundation, includes 119 paintings produced by a large group of Scandinavian artists gathered in the Civita d'Antino painting school founded by Kristian Zahrtmann, operating between 1883 and 1913, and which over the years has become one of the main sources of Danish art in Italy. Inspired by common life, which showed itself primitive, uncorrupted and ancient to their eyes, they portrayed numerous landscapes and scenes of village life. Works by Zahrtmann, Peder Severin Krøyer, Joakim Skovgaard, Carl Budtz-Møller - and many more - are exhibited.

=== Contemporary figurative artists ===
The 131 works, divided into 100 paintings, 20 serigraphs and 11 sculptures from a donation by Alfonso and Teresita Paglione, contain a selection of different fields of contemporary figurative art and were produced by seventy-three artists of the second half of the twentieth century, belonging to numerous and different stylistic groups and currents, ranging from moral and political rebellion to the fascist dictatorship and from the rhetorical interpretation of the classicism of Italian artists to the experience of the Accademia di San Fernando in Madrid, from which the group of artists of the Spanish Realidad. The collection also includes works by North American artists such as Larry Rivers, a forerunner of Pop art.

=== Temporary exhibition ===
The museum's first temporary exhibition, "Andy Warhol and Mario Schifano between Pop Art and Classicism", is hosted on Floor C and includes 101 works by Andy Warhol, including serigraphs, prints, photographs, drawings, posters, posters and magazine covers and over three hundred works by the Italian artist Mario Schifano, consisting of photographs, canvases and charcoals, also including the pictorial cycle of the "Matres Matutae", the last to have been made by the artist between 1995 and 1996. As part of the exhibition, the cycle is compared with the pre-Roman statues of the Matres Matutae, which Schifano was inspired by for the realization of the work, obtained on loan from the Campania Provincial Museum of Capua.
