= Christine Swane =

Danish painter

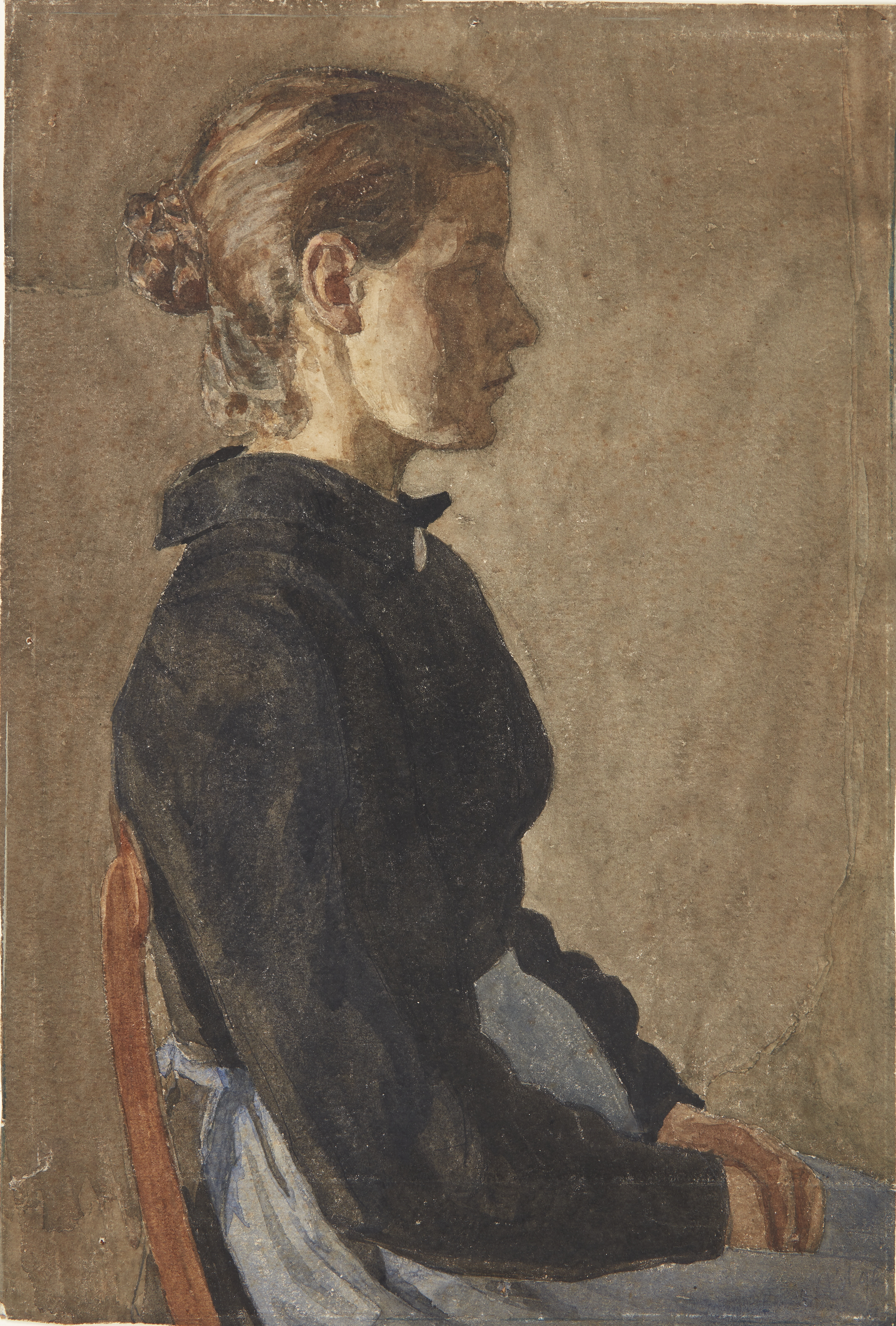
Portrait of the painter Christine Swane, née Larsen, as a young person

Christine Swane née Christine Larsen (29 May 1876 in Kerteminde – 16 August 1960 in Farum) was a Danish painter who first associated with the Funen Painters before developing her own increasingly Cubist style.

== Biography ==
Christine Swane was the sister of Johannes Larsen, one of the key members of the Funen Painters (Fynboerne), with whom she associated while young. She adopted their Naturalistic approach and strong use of colour as evidenced by her early flower paintings. After studying at the Danish Academy (1898–1901) under Viggo Johansen, she was instructed by Jens Ferdinand Willumsen, Fritz Syberg and Harald Giersing. Around 1910, she met Karl Isakson and Sigurd Swane who introduced her to contemporary French art. Her marriage with Swane ended in 1920 when they were divorced. Their son, Lars Swane (1913–2002), was also a successful artist.

== Artwork ==
Inspired by French trends, particularly Henri Matisse, her earlier still lifes often depict indoor scenes or window sills with strong attention to detail. She slowly developed her own style creating more decorative, geometrical works with Cubist associations and thin transparent colouring, dominated by cool yellows, blues and greens. Over the years, she became an ever more sensitive Colourist, benefiting from her travels to France, the Netherlands, Belgium and England (1938), Italy (1957) and frequent trips to Sweden and Norway. Her stays on Bornholm and in her summer house in the north of Jutland also influenced her style.

In addition to still lifes, she painted portraits, landscapes and forest scenes. One of her most notable works is the mosaic depicting female gymnasts at the women's baths in Frederiksberg (1951) in a flat, geometrical style. Her interest in ceramics, possibly influenced by Willumsen, also developed considerably over the years as did her sculpture and needlework. From 1937, she exhibited her paintings with the Grønningen cooperative. In 1943, she was awarded the Eckersberg Medal.
