= Kristian Zahrtmann =

Danish painter (1843–1917)

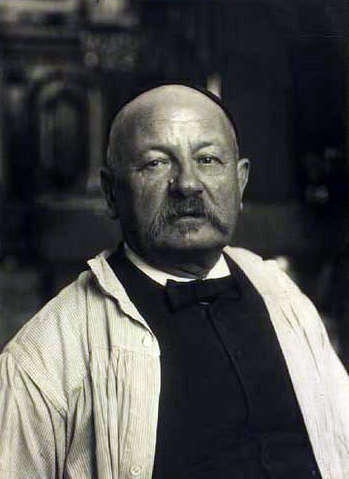
- Zahrtmann, c. 1900
- Born: Peder Henrik Christian Zahrtmann; 31 March 1843; Rønne, Denmark
- Died: 22 June 1917 (aged 74); Frederiksberg, Denmark
- Resting place: Vestre Cemetery, Copenhagen, Denmark
- Education: Royal Danish Academy of Fine Arts
- Organization: Kunstnernes Frie Studieskoler
- Awards: Neuhausen Prize, 1871, 1873; Hielmstierne-Rosencrone, 1883

Peder Henrik Kristian Zahrtmann, known as Kristian Zahrtmann, (31 March 1843 – 22 June 1917) was a Danish painter. He was a part of the Danish artistic generation in the late 19th century, along with Peder Severin Krøyer and Theodor Esbern Philipsen, who broke away from both the strictures of traditional Academicism and the heritage of the Golden Age of Danish Painting, in favor of naturalism and realism.

Zahrtmann was known especially for his history paintings, and especially those depicting strong, tragic, legendary women in Danish history. He also produced works of many other genres including landscapes, street scenes, folk scenes and portraits. Zahrtmann had a far-reaching effect on the development of Danish art through his effective support of individual style among his students during the many years he taught. In addition, his bold use of color dazzled contemporaries and has been seen as an anticipation of Expressionism by art historians.

== Early life and artistic training ==
Zahrtmann was born in Rønne, Denmark, on the island of Bornholm to chief doctor for the island Carl Vilhelm Zahrtmann (1810–1896) and wife Laurine Pouline Jespersen (1822–1918). He was the eldest child among seven boys and two girls. After graduating from Rønne Realskole at 17 years of age, Zahrtmann was sent to Sorø Academy, where he studied painting with landscape painter Hans Harder. He was often a guest at the home of the Academy's Director, poet Bernhard Severin Ingemann and his wife, where he had the chance to socialize with teachers of the school and other guests, such as Hans Christian Andersen. Zahrtmann graduated in 1862, and received his cand. phil in 1863. During these years he lived with a family whose daughter was a painter, which inspired him also to try his luck as an artist.

After graduating, Zahrtmann came to Copenhagen, where during the winter of 1863–1864 he studied drawing at the Technical Institute under Christian Hetsch and architect Ferdinand Vilhelm Jensen. He also received private instruction from genre painter Wenzel Ulrich Tornøe during this same time. Zahrtmann then began his studies in October 1864 at the Royal Danish Academy of Art (Danish: Det Kongelige Danske Kunstakademi) where he studied under Johan Adolph Kittendorff, Wilhelm Marstrand, Jørgen Roed, Niels Simonsen, and Frederik Vermehren, a fellow graduate of Sorø Academy. Classmates included August Jerndorff, Peder Severin Krøyer, and Rasmus Frederik Hendriksen.

== Early artistic career ==
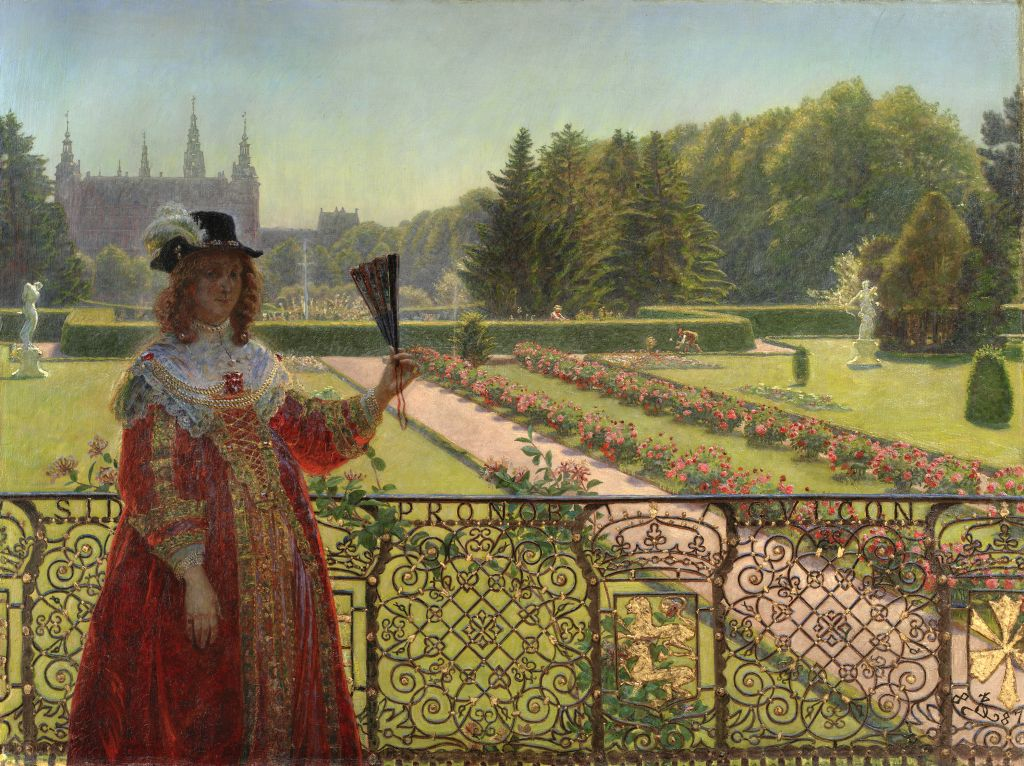
Leonora Christina in the Garden of Frederiksborg Palace, 1887

Zahrtmann graduated from the Academy in 1868, and exhibited for the first time at Charlottenborg the following year with "En Konfirmandinde paa Bornholm" ("A Young Girl Being Confirmed on Bornholm"). He exhibited regularly at Charlottenborg from 1869–1891, and sporadically afterwards.

He became friends with painter Otto Haslund and Pietro Købke Krohn, later Museum Director, with whom he shared a studio.

== Leonora Christina and other historical subjects ==
Zahrtmann had already become interested in the story of the heroic 17th century daughter of a Danish king, Leonora Christina Ulfeldt (also known as Eleanor Christine), before the 1869 posthumous publication of her 1674 autobiographical narrative Jammers Minde ("Remembrance of Misery"), which he received as a birthday gift from Haslund and Krohn.

Countess Leonora Christina of Schleswig-Holstein, King Christian IV's daughter by his morganatic love marriage to a noble Danish maiden, had fallen from grace because of her husband Corfits Ulfeldt's high treason. She was then imprisoned for 22 years in the Blue Tower (Blåtårn) in Copenhagen Castle, and spent her final years in the solitude of the Maribo Cloister.

Zahrtmann commemorated her story in a series of 18 large paintings over many years. The first of these paintings was made public in 1871, Slotsfogden skjæmter med Kvinderne i den nylig fængslede Kongedatters Kammer paa Blaataarn ("Castle Keeper Banters with Women in the Chamber of the King's Daughter in the Blue Tower"). The painting won him a Neuhausen Prize (Neuhausenske Præmie), was sold to Niels Laurits Høyen's influential Art Union (Kunstforeningen), and was followed by a series of other paintings on the same theme. These paintings established his reputation as one of the leading artists of his time.

Other pictures in the series include: Leonora Christina forlader Fængselet ("Leonora Christina Leaves Prison", 1873); Leonora Christina i Fængselet ("Leonora Christina in Prison", 1875) in the Hirschsprung Collection; Corfits Ulfeldt og Leonora Christina ("Corfitz Ulfeldt and Leonora Christina"); Dronning Sophie Amalies Død ("Queen Sophie Amalie’s Death", 1882); Leonora Christina paa Maribo Kloster ("Leonora Christina at Maribo Cloister", 1883), both in the collection of the Danish National Gallery; and three versions of Leonora Christina undersøges af Sophie Amalies Tjenerinder ("Leonora Christina Undressed and Searched by Sophie Amalie’s Maids", 1886, 1888, 1894) in the Hirschsprung Collection.

At the same time he explored other motifs, although Leonora Christina was an obsession that followed him throughout life. In 1872 he made a portrait of Georg Brandes, who summered near Zahrtmann at Christiansholm near Klampenborg north of Copenhagen.

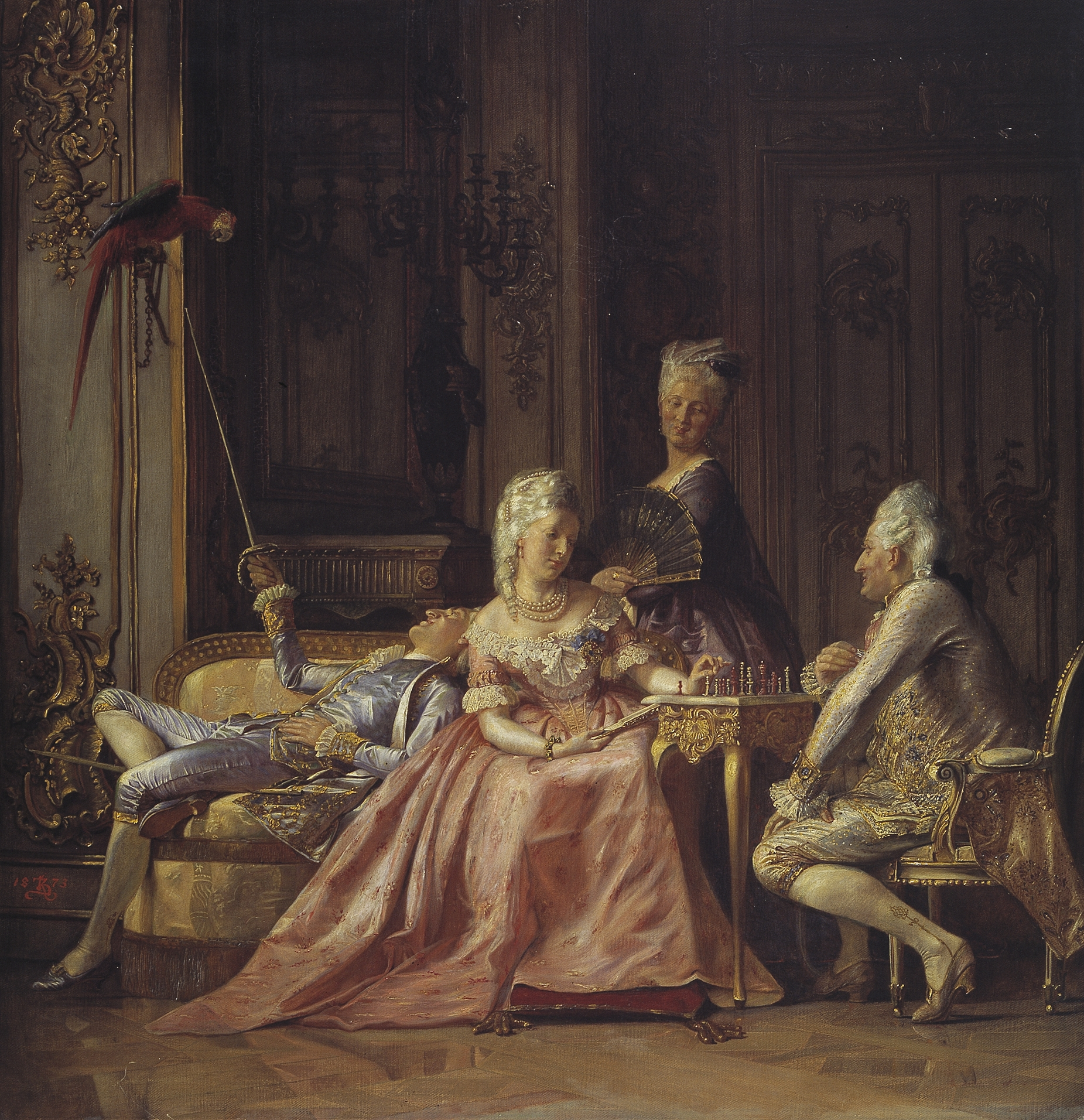
A 19th-century oil recreating the frivolous court of Christian VII by Kristian Zahrtmann at the Saatchi Gallery

In 1873 he won another Neuhausen Prize for Sigbrit gennemgår toldregnskaberne med Christian II ("Sigbrit Reviews Tax Accounts with Christian II"), and exhibited a preparatory painting for Job og hans Venner ("Job and His Friends"), which won him the Academy's gold medallion. The final painting of "Job and His Friends" is considered one of his masterpieces and won him the Academy's gold medallion in 1887.

In 1873 he also painted "Scene from the Court of Christian VII 1772" to retell the tragic story of Queen Caroline Matilda on the centennial of the fall of Johann Friedrich Struensee. The painting is in the Hirschsprung Collection. Characteristically for Zahrtmann, he made several other paintings over the years depicting the story of these figures.

== Student travels ==
Zahrtmann tried to extract a travel stipend from the Academy three times, which should have been due him as winner of the large gold medal, but the funds were not forthcoming until two years later. Zahrtmann spent the summer of 1873 at Hornbæk (Helsingør municipality) in the company of fellow painters Peder Severin Krøyer and Viggo Johansen.

Zahrtmann finally traveled to Italy in December 1875 with financing from his father, before he received a travel grant from the Academy. 1875-1878 he resided in Italy (Rome, Siena, Amalfi and Saracinesco), where he produced a number of paintings. He later returned to Italy many times, including in 1882–1884 on an Ancher Fund grant along with artists Joakim Skovgaard, Theodor Esbern Philipsen, and Viggo Pedersen. He was fascinated by everyday life there, by the strong Italian sun, the vivid colors, and the exotic splendor of Roman Catholic Church rites which he depicted in many paintings.

In June 1883, Zahrtmann traveled for the first time to Civita d'Antino, a mountain town he came to consider his second home. Between 1890 and 1911 he spent every summer in Civita d'Antino, living with the Cerroni family and gathering friends and students in an annual artist colony. He was named an honorary citizen of the town in 1902.

Zahrtmann also traveled to Greece several times, as well as to France and Portugal.

Zahrtmann exhibited at the World's Exhibition in Paris in 1878, 1889, and 1900, and in Chicago in 1893. He won a bronze medallion at the World Exhibition in Paris 1900.

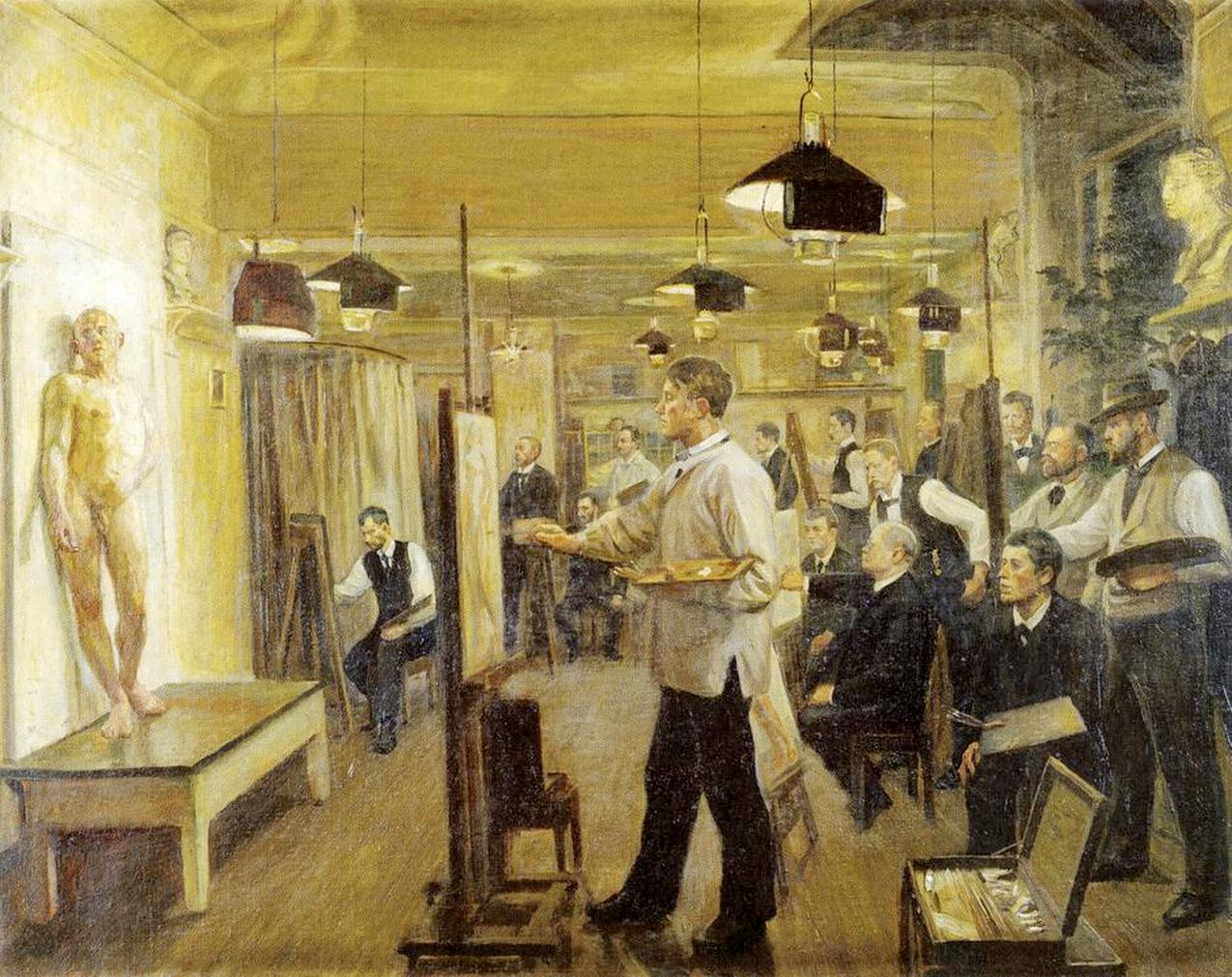
Zahrtmann's School (Poul S. Christiansen, 1899)

== Beyond painting ==
Kunstnernes Frie Studieskoler was established in the winter of 1882–1883 as a protest against the Art Academy's policies and as an alternative to its educational program. It was led by Laurits Tuxen, and Peder Severin Krøyer was hired as one of its teachers. Zahrtmann taught at the school from 1885 to 1908. In 1893 he became the leader of its preparatory class, which under him turned into an independent department. He had some 200 students from the Scandinavian countries. Because of his prominence as a teacher, the school was often simply referred to as "Zahrtmann’s School". Some of his students included Funen artists Peter Hansen, Fritz Syberg, Poul S. Christiansen, Johannes Larsen, Johannes Wilhjelm, and Oluf Hartmann as well as modern painters Karl Isakson, Edvard Weie, Harald Giersing, and Olaf Rude.

He helped establish the "Free Exhibition" (Den frie Udstilling), an alternative exhibition space, which opened in 1891.

== Later artistic career ==
Zahrtmann made a number of portraits of his parents, including one of his father in 1887 and one of his mother, who played a significant role in his life, in 1899–1901. These, as well as a large format painting of both parents in their living room from 1895 to 1901, are in the collection of the Bornholm Art Museum.

In 1900 he overwintered in Portofino where he painted the color-drenched landscapes Havnen i Portofino, 1900 ("Harbour in Portofino, 1900") and Mit frokostbord i Portofino, 1900 ("My Lunch Table in Portofino, 1900").

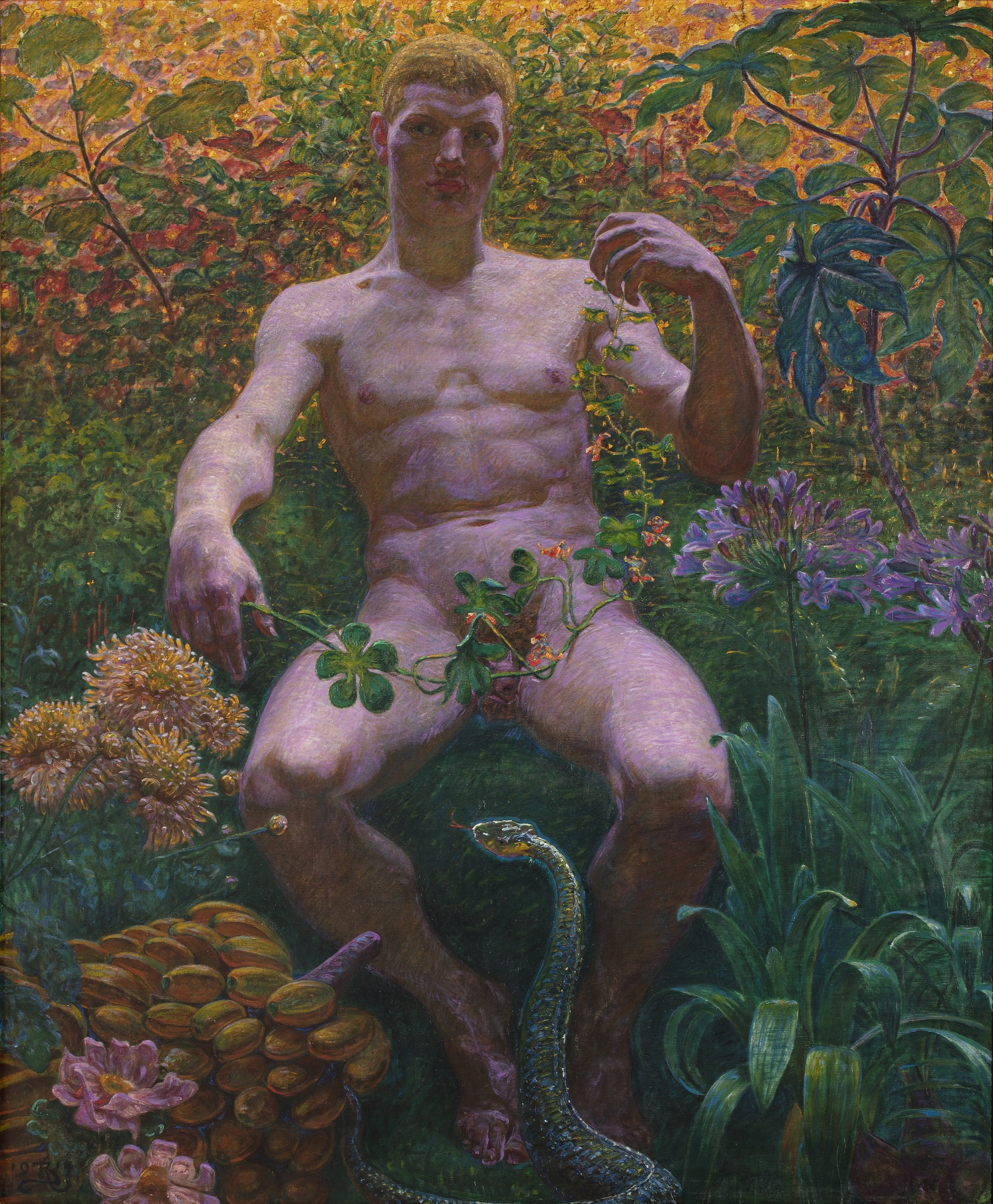
Adam in Paradise

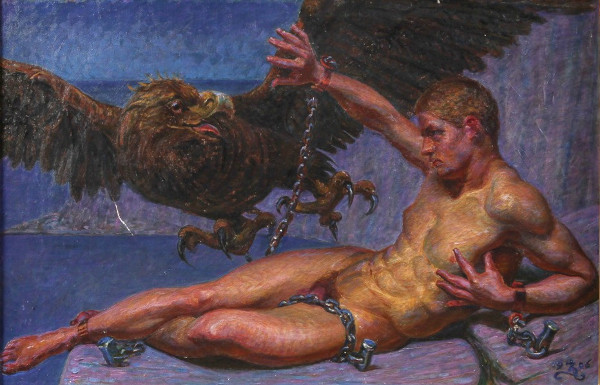
Prometheus

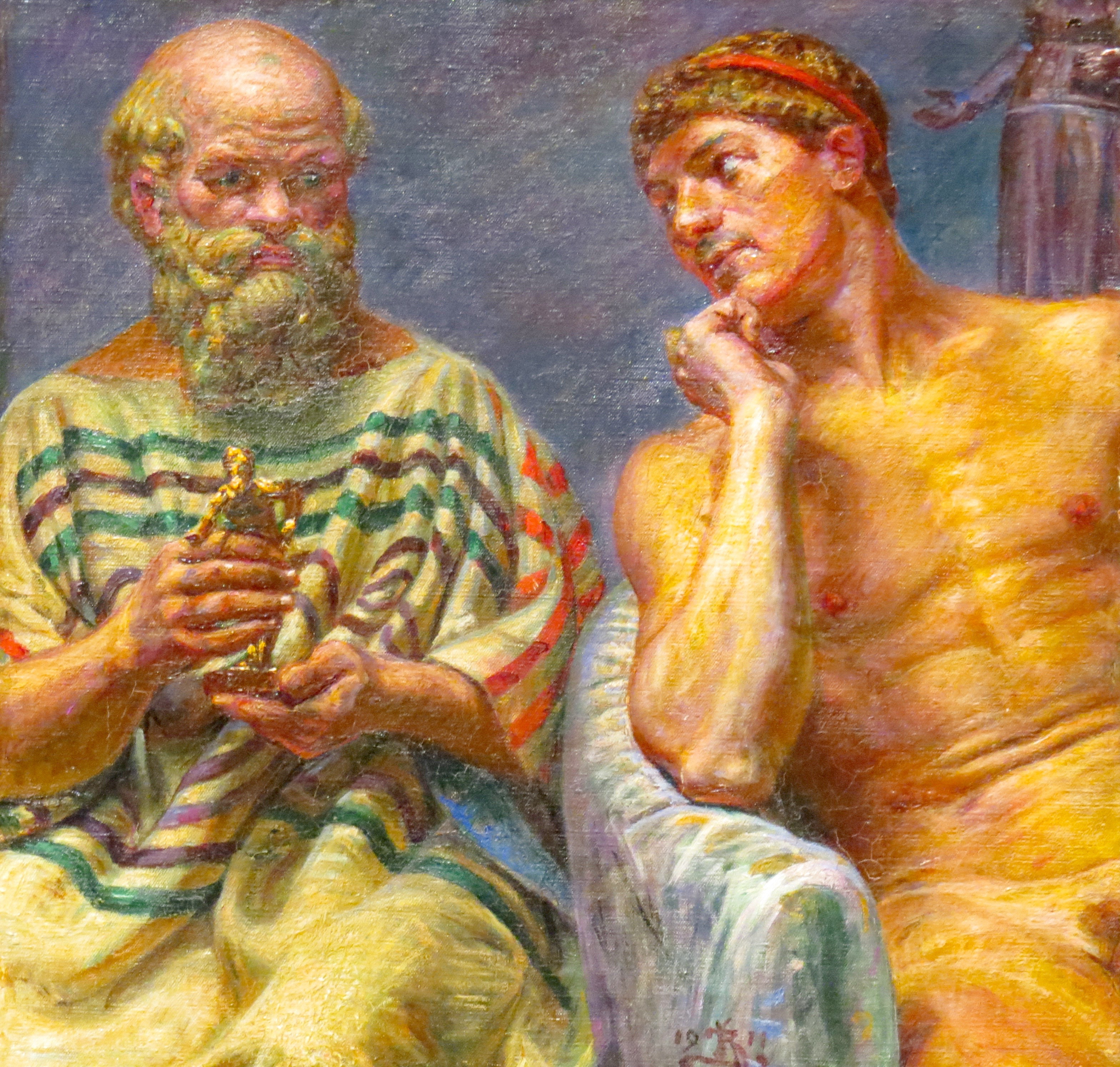
Socrates and Alcibiades

Late in life, Zahrtmann produced a number of paintings of nude men, including Prometheus (1906), Sokrates og Alkibiades (1907, 1911), and Adam i Paradis (in two versions, 1913–14). In an era that was still shaken by the Great Scandinavian Sexual Morality Debate of the outgoing 19th century, these works were immediately scored as scandalous violations of public decency. The treatment of Adam is particularly provocative, with its vital, young, muscular Adam casually concealing his manhood with leaves from the flame flower (a twist on the typical depiction of fig leaves) while leaning back in a lush, vividly colored botanic paradise, the snake arched halfway up his leg and darting its tongue. Museums primly declined to purchase these homoerotic works, and most are still in private hands. Zahrtmann never married, and in Copenhagen he was rumored to enjoy crossdressing.

Zahrtmann also painted a number of self-portraits in his later years, including one painted in 1913 that is considered one of his finest works. It is in the collection of the National Historic Museum at Frederiksborg Palace.

Zahrtmann bought land on Fuglebakken in Frederiksberg and built a house, which was designed by Hans Koch and Zahrtmann himself. He called the house "Casa d’Antino" and moved in autumn 1912.

Zahrtmann appeared in a 1913 silent-era documentary film about himself entitled Kristian Zahrtmann, which was directed by Sophus Wangøe.

== Death and legacy ==
In June 1917 he was hospitalized with appendicitis. After an apparent improvement his condition worsened, and he died on 22 June in Frederiksberg. He was buried in Vestre Cemetery, Copenhagen. A relief with the theme of "Leonora Christina Leaves the Prison" decorates his grave. The relief was drawn by architect Thorvald Bindesbøll and painter Joakim Skovgaard, and was carved from Bornholm granite by Larsen Stevns.

In Civita d’Antino a memorial plaque was set into the wall of the Cerroni house near the town gate. A monument with a statue of Zahrtmann was erected on the open plaza in front of his house, and the plaza is named after him.

Numerous paintings by Zahrtmann became available to the public when the Imago Museum opened in Pescara in 2021.

A portrait of him by Vilhelm Hammershøi (1899) is found in the Hirschsprung Collection.

== Other works ==
- San Lidano fest i Civita d’Antino ("San Lidano Celebration in Civita d’Antino") (1890), privately owned.
- Kejser og kejserinde Friedrich på villa Carnazvore i oktober 1887 ("Kaiser Friedrich and the Empress at Villa Carnazvore, October 1887") (1900), privately owned.
- Det mystiske bryllup mellem biskoppen og abbedissen af Pistoja fejres uden for S. Peitro år 1500 ("The Mystical Wedding between the Bishop and the Abbess of Pistoja Is Celebrated Outside of St. Peters in the Year 1500") (1894–1895), Bornholm Art Museum.

== See also ==
- List of Danish painters
