= Colourist painting =

Art style characterized by intense use of colour

Colourist painting is a style of painting characterised by the use of intense colour, which becomes the dominant feature of the resultant work of art, more important than its other qualities. It has been associated with a number of artists and art movements throughout the 20th century.

== Influences ==
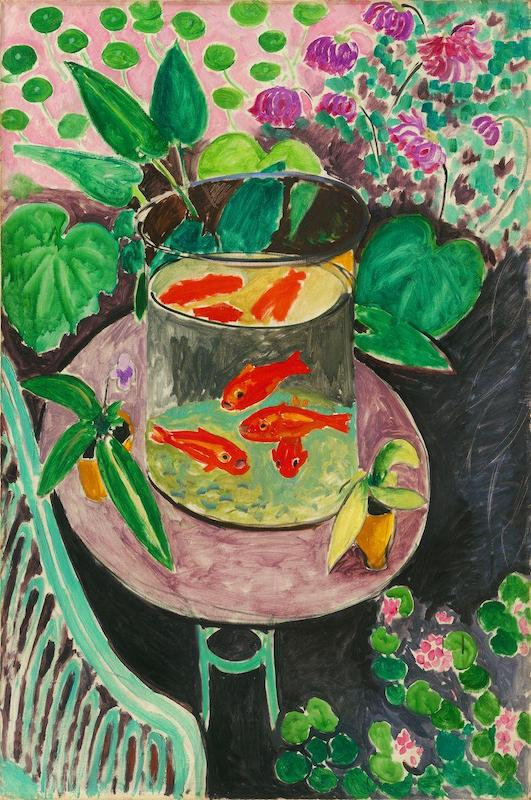
Henri Matisse, Goldfish, 1912; a Fauvist painting

The French Impressionism movement of the 19th century was influential on the development of Colourist painting and other similar movements such as Fauvism and Expressionism. Impressionists moved away from more neutral colours such as black or brown, instead using unblended and bright colours, something that differentiated their style from others. Impressionism would prove to be a highly influential movement, with later art movements such as Fauvism taking on similar stylistic choices.

== Styles ==
Aspects of colourist painting can be found in a number of art styles and movements that developed in the years after Impressionism. Notably, the Fauvists of the early 20th century are seen as the movement which brought Colourist painting to prominence. Many of the Fauvists were interested in colour theory, especially with the relationship between complementary colours. Artists such as André Derain and Henri Matisse, the founders of Fauvism, are known for their use of bold, sometimes unnatural colours. Similarly, the Expressionist movement of the 20th century is also known for its use of intense colour.

While experimentation with art and art styles was quite popular in France, other countries had their own experimental art movements. One such movement was the Kapists, a group of Polish Colourists in the interwar period, who made colour one of the central elements in their painting. Much like the Impressionists, the Kapists were interested in the relationship between colours, specifically in their contrasts and complements.

Another group known for their use of colour is the Scottish Colourists, a group of four painters whose work was highly influenced by movements such as Impressionism and Fauvism. Like other Colourist painters, this group was known for their interest in the relationship between light and colour as well as painting en plein air, while still expressing individual styles within their works.As art in the 20th century developed, new groups, such as the abstract expressionist, further explored colours in their increasingly-abstract works. The abstract expressionist largely split into two groups: the action painters, such as Willem De Kooning or Jackson Pollock, and the color field painters, such as Helen Frankenthaler and Mark Rothko. The artists of action paintings typically apply colours with gestural brushstrokes communicating severe emotional intensity through purposely-chaotic and complex composition; these colors may be semi-dichromatic or feature a larger spectrum of colours. The Colour field painters used colourist techniques, using colour to represent the subjects of their paintings rather than actually depicting the subject itself; this is often achieved through a de-stijl-like use of strict horizontals and vertical or a more-fluid composition such as those using the soak-stain technique.

In regard to individual styles, Pierre Bonnard was a Colourist painter, known for putting emphasis on the relationship of the subjects of his art with light and colour. He was part of a Parisian artist group, the Nabis, who were known for their decorative painting full of colour and patterns.

== See also ==
- Color theory
- Post-impressionism
- Fauvism
- Action Painting
- Color field painting
- Abstract expressionism
