= Johannes Larsen =

Danish artist

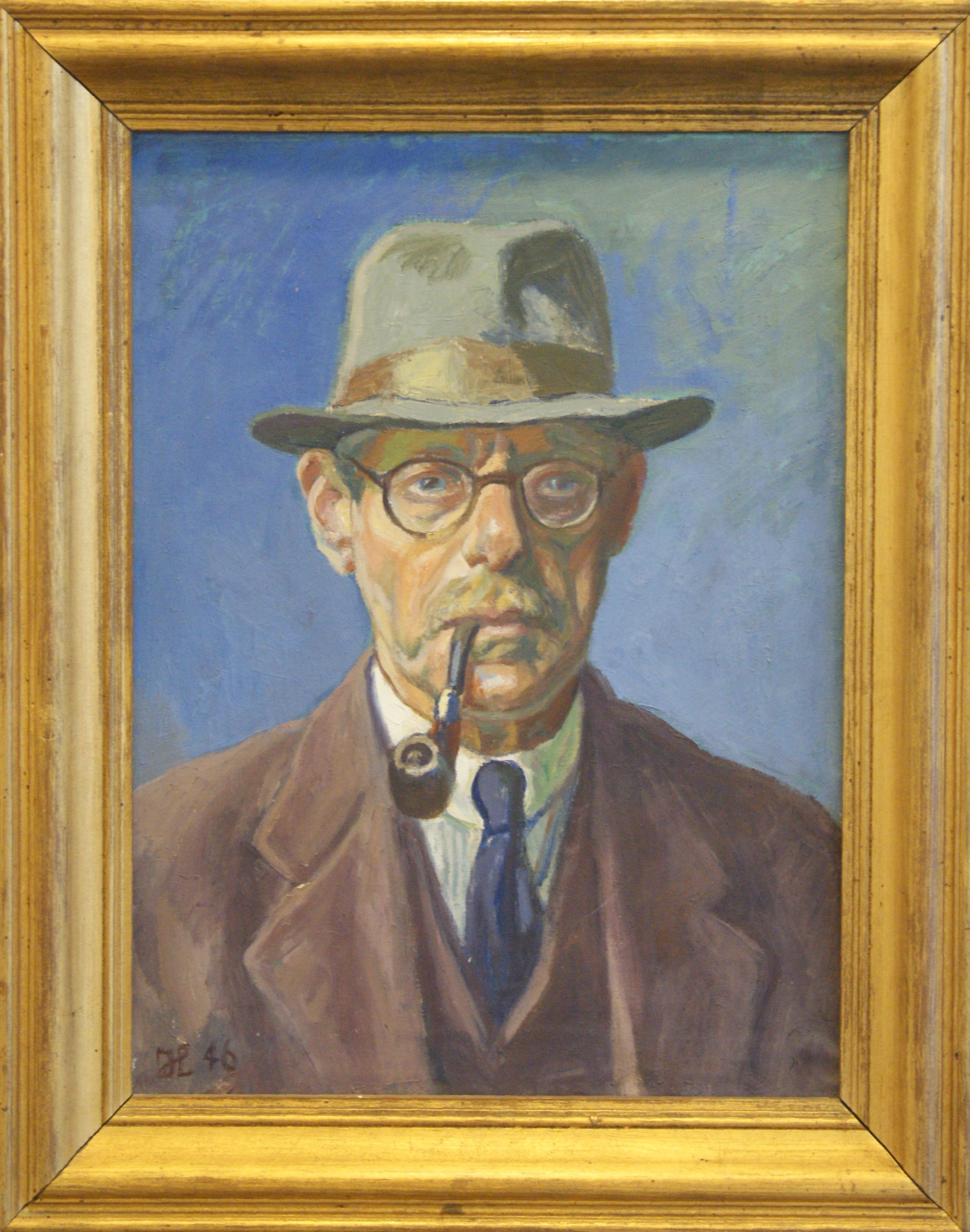
Self-portrait by Johannes Larsen (1946).

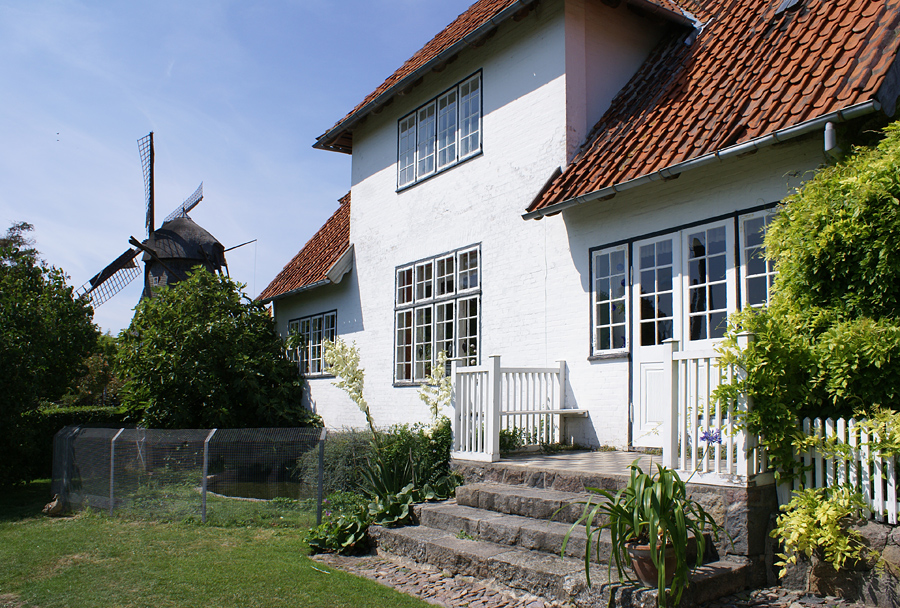
Johannes Larsen's home 1901–64, now part of the Johannes Larsen Museum. In the background the windmill Svanemøllen, which delivered a small income until the death of the artist in 1964, is now restored, is part of the museum, and functions on special occasions

Johannes Larsen (27 December 1867 – 20 December 1961) was a Danish nature painter.

== Biography ==
Larsen was born in Kerteminde on Funen, Denmark. He was the son of Jeppe Andreas L. and Vilhelmine Christine Bless. His father was a merchant.

Larsen studied art at the Free School in Copenhagen under Kristian Zahrtmann (1843–1917) in the 1880s. There he met other painters from Funen, notably Fritz Syberg (1862–1939) and Peter Marius Hansen (1868–1928), both from the southern port of Faaborg, and the Funish Painters group (Fynboerne) was born. They went on to create an art colony that influenced many Danish and Swedish artists and brought them success.

In 1898, he was married to the painter Alhed Maria Warberg (1872–1927). Between 1901 and 1902, the artist couple built their home on Møllebakken in Kerteminde. Their home became the gathering place in summer months for many painters, particularly younger artists from Zahrtmann's school.

Their ideal was to paint outdoors, not just sketching but painting in all kinds of weather. Their paintings have a freshness and energy not previously seen, except in sketches. Once they became successful, they were attacked by symbolist artists for being "farmer painters" in a newspaper debate in 1907. This only brought the Funish group more sympathy, especially from a group of authors working from the provinces in Jutland. Their chief spokesman was Johannes V. Jensen (1873–1950) who won the Nobel Prize for Literature in 1930.

In 1910, businessman Mads Rasmussen (1856–1916), who operated a successful cooperative canning factory in Faaborg, decided to start a museum for Funish Art next to his canning factory. He created the Faaborg Museum, which still exists, and gave the Funish painters a boost, both by making their works available to a broad public and by supporting them financially.

Kristian Zahrtmann exhorted all his students to paint in Italy; now some of them could afford to do so, and the Syberg and Hansen families enjoyed extended stays there. Larsen and his wife, Alhed Warberg Larsen, built a large studio and traveled mostly in Scandinavia.

Larsen was mainly heralded as a bird painter, before this was a familiar genre in Scandinavia. He popularized images of birds, particularly through his woodcuts and smaller paintings. Later he received commissions to illustrate books and paint large paintings for public buildings, such as the Queen's receiving room at Christiansborg Castle (seat of the Danish Parliament) and the City Hall of Odense, capital city of Funen.

There were several female Funish painters, struggling to be considered along with their male counterparts with greater or lesser success. They were Alhed Warberg Larsen, Anna Hansen Syberg (1870–1914) and Christine Larsen Swane (1876–1960), the wives/sisters of Larsen, Fritz Syberg and Peter Hansen. Their paintings are considered worthy of inclusion in many museums and collections today, though at the time they had a hard time exhibiting on an equal footing with their male colleagues. Christine Swane, who lived the longest, became a member of the artist cooperative called Corner when she was 60 and enjoyed great success in her later years.

The work of all these artists can be seen at the Johannes Larsen Museum in Kerteminde, the Faaborg Museum in Faaborg, the Statens Museum for Kunst (National Art Museum) in Copenhagen, Funen's Art Museum in Odense, as well as in many other museums and collections.

== Other sources ==
- Erland Porsmose (1999) Johannes Larsen, Menneske, Kunstner og Naturoplever (Copenhagen: Gyldendal) ISBN 978-8700371385
