= George Crawford (American businessman) =

American businessman (1861–1935)

- Born: George Washington Crawford; June 4, 1861; Emlenton, Pennsylvania, U.S.
- Died: April 6, 1935 (aged 73); Pittsburgh, Pennsylvania, U.S.
- Education: Eastman Business College
- Occupations: Chairman of Columbia Gas & Electric
- Spouse: Annie Laurie Warmack (m. 1927)
- Children: Martha Sharp Crawford
- Parent(s): Ebenezer Crawford; Elizabeth Wilson
- Relatives: Cosima von Bülow (granddaughter)

George Washington Crawford (June 4, 1861 – April 6, 1935) was a prominent American businessman of the late 19th and early 20th century who was a founder and executive with Columbia Gas & Electric. Crawford was the father of New York socialite Sunny von Bülow, who spent 28 years in a coma (her husband was tried twice and ultimately acquitted)

== Early life ==
Crawford was born on June 4, 1861. He was the son of Elizabeth Wilson (1833–1906) and Ebenezer "Eben" Crawford (1821–1897), a farmer from Emlenton, Venango County, Pennsylvania.

He was a descendant of Scottish immigrants. He was educated in public schools and at the Eastman Business College in Poughkeepsie, New York.

== Career ==
According to local Emlenton history records, Eben and his brothers traveled west during the California gold rush but "returned home penniless." The brothers reportedly tried a variety of business ventures, originally focusing on a pipe line business. He then entered the well supply business in Bolivar, New York, and in 1886, along with the United States Pipe Line Company, he obtained a right of way from Bradford oil field to the eastern seaboard. Thereafter, he formed the New Martinsville Gas Company in West Virginia and maintained an interest in the Tri-State National Gas Company.

In 1893, Crawford, along with brother-in-law Milo Clinton Treat (1841–1925) (husband of his late sister Clara Minerva Crawford), formed Emlenton Gas Co., the first natural gas corporation which first operated in Corning, Ohio. Crawford made a fortune after reserves of oil and natural gas were discovered on Eben's farm in 1901. He later formed the Ohio Fuel Supply Company, which merged with the much larger Columbia Gas & Electric in 1926, and became one of the leading American utilities companies of the 20th century.

By 1931, he was the chairman of the board of Columbia Gas & Electric, owner of Lone Star Gas Co. in Texas, helped develop Western Public Service Corporation, and was a major investor in significant oil and gas reserves in Mexico. He also served as a trustee of the Union Trust Company of Pittsburgh.

== Personal life ==
In 1927, 66-year-old Crawford married Annie Laurie Warmack (1900–1984), a native of St. Louis who was 27. She was the daughter of Robert Warmack (1862–1924), the wealthy founder of the International Shoe Company, and Martha Sharp Warmack (1869–1956). In 1932, when Crawford was 71, his only child was born, reportedly in Crawford's personal railroad carriage. The family had two homes, one in the Squirrel Hill section of Pittsburgh and a second home (previously his father's residence) at 304 Hill Street, Emlenton, PA. Their daughter was:

- Martha Sharp "Sunny" Crawford (1932–2008), who married Prince Alfred von Auersperg (d. 1992) in 1957. They divorced in 1965 and she remarried in 1966 to Claus von Bülow, a former aide to oilman J. P. Getty. They divorced in 1988, following her injury in 1980, and she died in 2008 after having been in a coma for nearly 28 years.

Crawford died on April 6, 1935. Upon his death, he left his estate to his widow and his three-year-old daughter, valued at more than US$100 million (UK£75 million). His widow, who remarried in 1957 to Russell Barnett Aitken (1910–2002), who owned Champ Soleil in Newport, Rhode Island, and their daughter moved to New York City and Greenwich, Connecticut. After his widow's death in 1984, her widower, Aitken remarried Irene (née Boyd) McAlpin Roosevelt, the widow of John Aspinwall Roosevelt, youngest son of President Franklin D. Roosevelt.

Through his only daughter, Sunny, he was the grandfather of Cosima von Bülow (b. 1967).
