= Mariebjerg Cemetery =

Cemetery in Gentofte, Copenhagen, Denmark

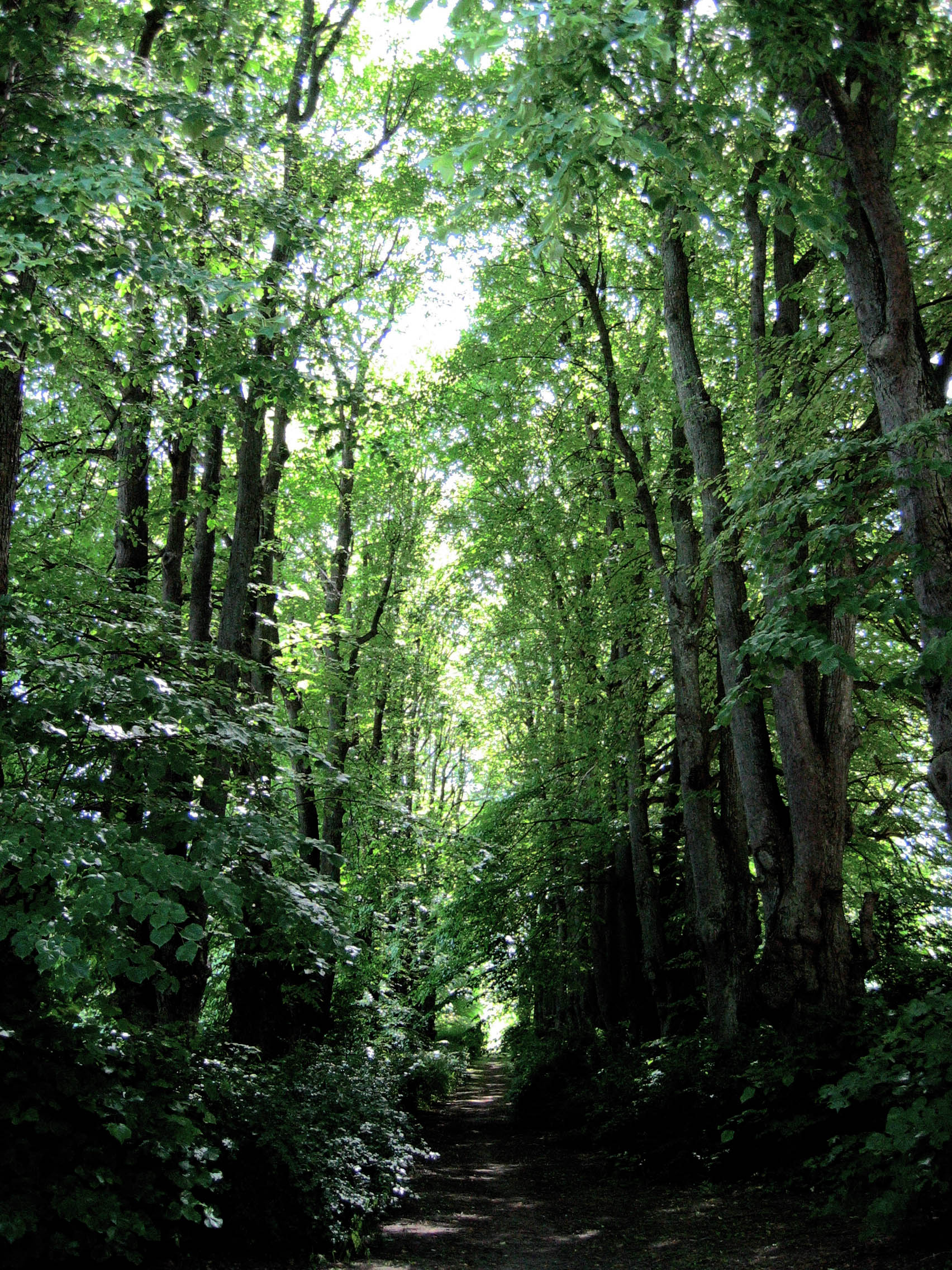
- One of the tree-lined avenues
- Interactive map of Mariebjerg Cemetery

Details
- Established: 1926-1933
- Location: Gentofte, Copenhagen
- Country: Denmark
- Coordinates: 55°45′37″N 12°30′35″E
- Type: Public
- Owned by: Gentofte Municipality
- Size: 26.6 ha (66 acres)
- Website: Official site
- Find a Grave: Mariebjerg Cemetery

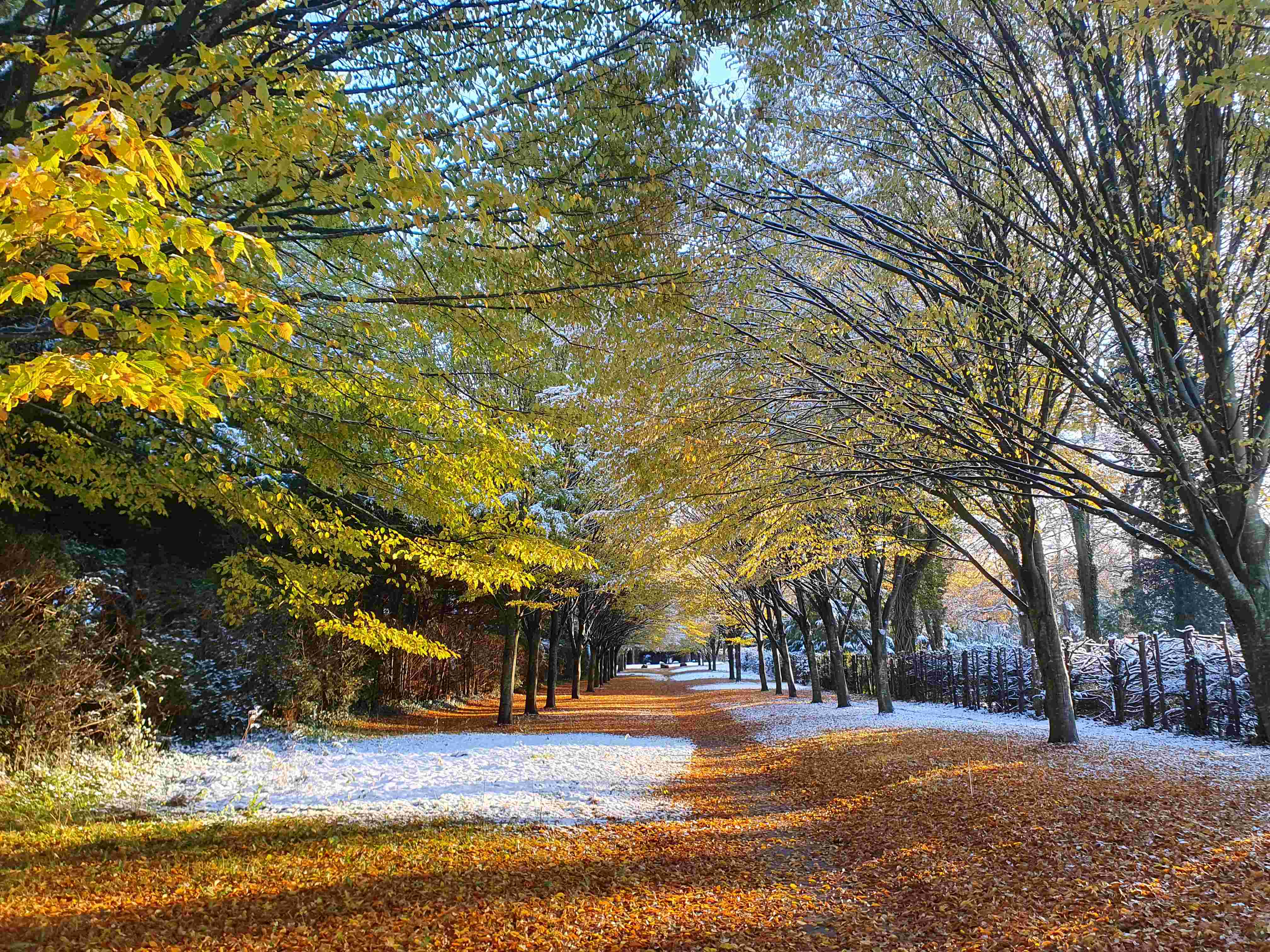
Mariebjerg Cemetery in winter

Mariebjerg Cemetery (Danish: Mariebjerg Kirkegård) is located in Gentofte north of Copenhagen, Denmark. It was laid out between 1926 and 1933 to the design of the landscape architect Gudmund Nyeland Brandt and is considered an important example of European Modernist landscape architecture. Its design has inspired many other cemeteries both in Denmark and abroad.

== Layout ==
Mariebjerg Cemetery is laid out in a tight, schematic grid pattern over an area of just over 25 hectares. A network of wide avenues cut through the cemetery and long, metre-high hedges subdivide the area.

Each of the resulting spaces contains an interpretation of a characteristic part of the Danish landscape, ranging from dense woods and glades, over ditches, meadows, fields and overgrown slopes to well-nursed garden settings.

== Buildings ==
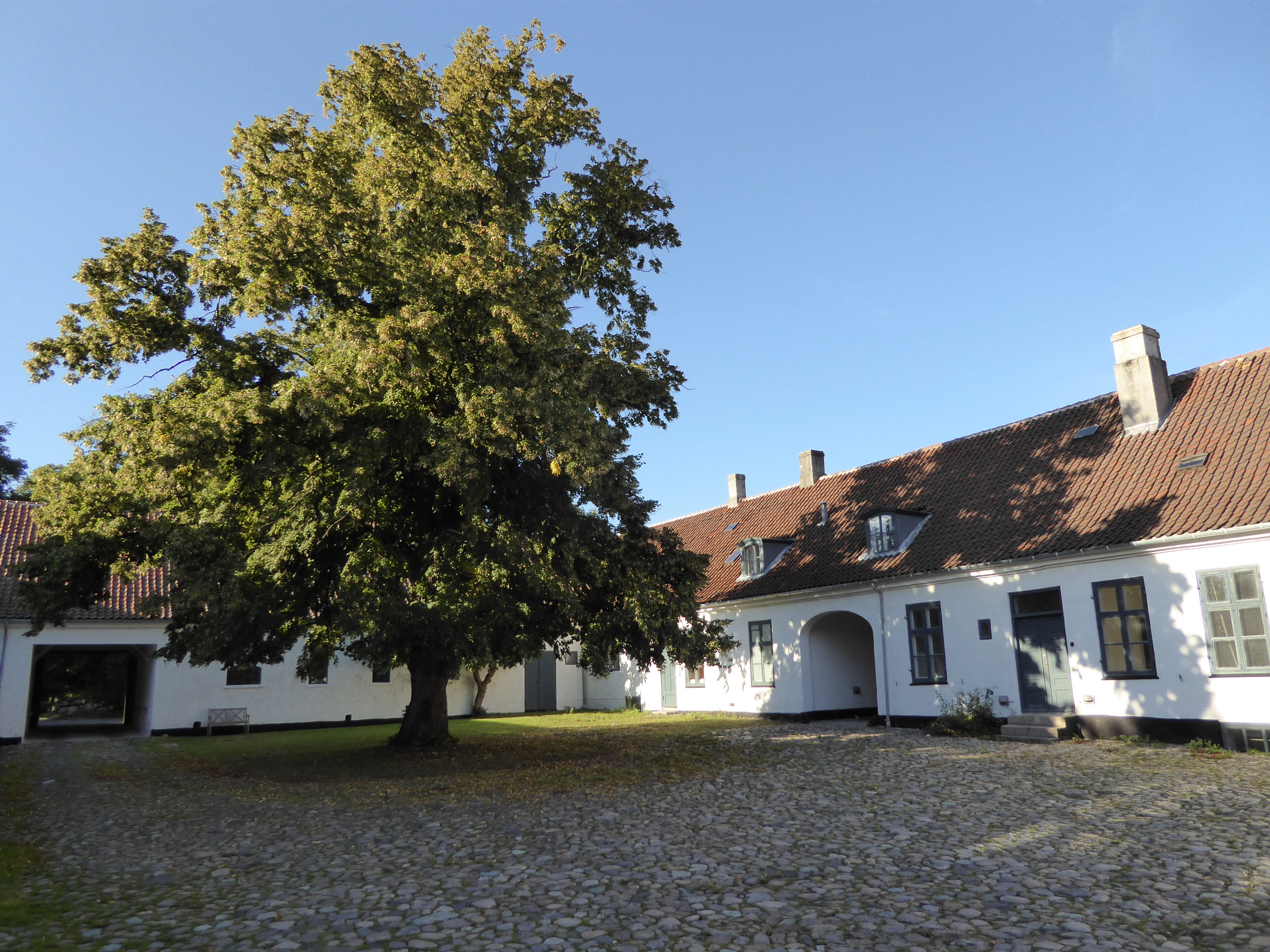
Vintappergården

=== Vintappergården ===
Vintappergården dates from c. 1770. It was listed on the Danish registry of protected buildings and places in 1918.

=== Mariebjerg Crematory and Chapel ===
Mariebjerg Crematory and Chapel was added in 1936. It was built to the design of Frits Schlegel.

== Notable burials ==
- da:Henrik Bentzon (1895–1971), actor
- Jørgen Bentzon (1897–1951), composer
- da:Karl Bjarnhof (communal grave)
- Augusta Blad
- Aage Niels Bohr (1922–2009), Nobel Prize laureate in physics
- Svend Borberg (1888–1947), author, playwright, editor and literary critic
- da:Anna Borg (1903–1963), actress
- Erik Bruhn (1928–1986), danseur, choreographer, artistic director, actor, and author
- Anton Frederik Bruun (1901–1961), oceanographer and ichthyologist (communal grave)
- Holger Valdemar Brøndsted
- Henny Lindorff Buckhøj (1935–1994), actor
- Jørgen Buckhøj (fællesgrav)
- Per Buckhøj
- Poul Bundgaard
- Mogens Bøggild
- da:Arne Ole David
- da:Ingolf David
- Nanna Ditzel
- da:Erik Erstad-Jørgensen (fællesgrav)
- da:Troels Fink
- da:Leck Fischer
- da:Olaf Forchhammer
- Erling Foss
- Svend Fournais
- Blanche Funch
- Georg Galster
- Johannes Glob
- Kip Glob
- Ernst Goldschmidt
- Kaj Gottlob
- Peder Gram
- Ragna Grubb
- Mogens Halbye
- Hans Peter Hansen
- Søren Hansen
- Flemming Holbek
- Gy Holdorf
- Kai Holm
- Tyge Hvass
- A.C. Højberg Christensen
- F. E. Jensen
- Tudlik Johansen
- Gunnar Jørgensen
- Minna Jørgensen
- Troels G. Jørgensen
- Reimert Kehlet
- Pouel Kern
- Valdemar Koppel
- Hans Kurt
- Christian Laursen
- Henrik Leth
- Boje Lundgaard
- Leo Mathisen
- Knud Meister
- Søren Melson
- Børge Mogensen (fællesgrav)
- Finn Monies
- Manja Mourier
- Jais Nielsen
- Ville Jais Nielsen
- Ann-Sofi Norin
- Gull-Maj Norin
- Leif Otto Normann
- Povl Olrik
- Alfred Osmund
- Hans W. Petersen (fællesgrav)
- Aage Rafn
- Annelise Reenberg
- Poul Reumert
- Christian Reventlow
- Louis Rosen Schmidt
- Bendt Rothe
- Karl Schou
- Hans Georg Skovgaard
- Victor Skaarup
- Carl Erik Soya
- Hakon Stephensen (fællesgrav)
- Claus Strandberg
- Magnus Suenson
- C.Th. Sørensen
- Hans J. Wegner
- Thorvald Claudi Westh
- Richard Willerslev
- John Wittig
- Kurt Fromberg

== See also ==
- Parks and open spaces in Copenhagen
