= Cosima von Bülow Pavoncelli =

British socialite and philanthropist (born 1967)

- Born: Cosima von Bülow; 15 April 1967 (age 59); New York City, United States
- Education: Brown University (BA)
- Occupation: Socialite
- Known for: International Best Dressed List Hall of Fame (1999)
- Spouse: Count Riccardo Pavoncelli (m. 1996)
- Children: 3
- Parent(s): Claus von Bülow; Sunny von Bülow

Countess Cosima von Bülow Pavoncelli (born 15 April 1967) is a British socialite and philanthropist of American and Danish descent.

The daughter of businessman Claus von Bülow and socialite Sunny von Bülow, she was born in New York City. She was named to the International Best Dressed List Hall of Fame in 1999.

== Early life ==
Cosima von Bülow was born on April 15, 1967, in New York City. She is the daughter of Sunny von Bülow and Claus von Bülow, and the third child of her mother. She has two older half-siblings from her mother’s first marriage, Ala von Auersperg and Alexander von Auersperg. She attended the Chapin School in New York City and Brown University.

She spent parts of her childhood at her family’s residence, Clarendon Court, in Newport, Rhode Island. Following her mother’s legal case and the subsequent acquittal of Claus von Bülow in 1985, Cosima moved to London to live with her father.

== Personal life ==
Following Claus von Bülow’s criminal proceedings, relations between him and his mother-in-law, Annie Laurie Aitken, became strained. Sunny's children from her first marriage remained convinced that Claus von Bülow had attempted to murder their mother, while Cosima von Bülow supported her father. As a result, Cosima was disinherited in 1981 by Aitken, her maternal grandmother.

Upon Aitken’s death on May 4, 1984, Cosima was excluded from her estate. Cosima subsequently brought legal proceedings, alleging that relatives had exerted undue influence over Aitken in relation to the distribution of the estate.

In July 1985, shortly after Claus von Bülow was acquitted at his second trial, Ala and Alexander von Auersperg filed a civil lawsuit seeking $56 million in damages against him on behalf of their mother’s estate. The dispute was settled out of court on 24 December 1987, when Claus von Bülow agreed to divorce Sunny, relinquish any claim to her fortune (then estimated at $25–40 million), and leave the United States. In return, Cosima was reinstated in Aitken’s will and received approximately $30 million as her one-third share of the estate.

In 1996, Cosima von Bülow married Count Riccardo Pavoncelli, an Italian banker. Pavoncelli is the son of Giuseppe Pavoncelli and Rosalba Morelli, and belongs to the Italian Pavoncelli family, which includes the politician Giuseppe Pavoncelli.

The couple had three children:

- Nicolas Antonio Riccardo Pavoncelli (born 10 August 1998)
- Marina Gaetana Pavoncelli (born 20 June 2000)
- Antonia Carolina Pavoncelli (born 23 November 2005)

Sunny von Bülow remained in a persistent vegetative state until her death from cardiopulmonary arrest on 6 December 2008 at the Mary Manning Walsh Nursing Home in New York City.

Following her death, Cosima and her half-siblings held a memorial service on 14 January 2009 at the Brick Presbyterian Church on the Upper East Side of Manhattan, the same church where the von Bülows had previously married.

== Philanthropy ==
Von Bülow Pavoncelli donates money to education programs and cultural institutions in Britain and environmental causes around the world. She also administers the Sunny Crawford von Bülow Fund at New York City's Morgan Library & Museum, buying drawings in her mother's name upon the advice of the museum's curators.

== In popular culture ==
Cosima von Bülow was portrayed as a child by Kristi Hundt and Kara Emerson in the 1990 film Reversal of Fortune, directed by Barbet Schroeder. The film dramatises the legal case involving her father, Claus von Bülow, who was tried for the attempted murder of his wife, Sunny von Bülow. The film stars Jeremy Irons as Claus von Bülow and Glenn Close as Sunny von Bülow, and is based in part on the account of defence attorney Alan Dershowitz, particularly his book Reversal of Fortune: Inside the von Bülow Case (1985).

== Ancestry ==
Ancestors of Cosima von Bülow Pavoncelli

8. Christian Borberg
4. Svend Borberg
9. Caroline Amalie Dorothea Ernestine Thea de Hofman-Schmidt
2. Claus von Bülow
10. Frits Toxwerdt von Bülow-Plüskow
5. Jonna von Bülow-Plüskow
11. Fanny Augusta Frederikke Poulsen
1. Cosima von Bülow Pavoncelli
12. Ebenezer Crawford
6. George Washington Crawford
13. Elizabeth Wilson
3. Sunny von Bülow
14. Robert Nathaniel Warmack
7. Annie Laurie Warmack
15. Martha Sharp
