= Kurt Trampedach =

Danish painter and sculptor (1943–2013)

Trampedach selfportrait from the 1980s painted in a more realistic style than most of his selfportraits which generally tended towards surrealism.

Kurt Trampedach (13 May 1943 – 12 November 2013) was a Danish painter and sculptor.

== Biography ==
Trampedach was born at Hillerød. He studied at the Danish Academy of Fine Arts from 1963 to 1969. He had his artistic breakthrough by the end of the sixties. He has often made distorted self-portraits and portraits of his own wife. Portraits of horses, and of large- headed babies were other favorite motifs. His dark style was particularly inspired by Rembrandt van Rijn. Painting was a way for him to work with his own psyche, with frequent bouts of depression and mania. In 1983 Trampedach's studio in Copenhagen was set on fire destroying many paintings. In 1984 he received the Eckersberg Medal.

With his wife he moved to Sare in the French Pyrenees where he lived in a house built by himself, raising animals and painting.

In April 2002 his house and studio in France was burned down while he was in Denmark preparing an exhibition. And within a month his studio in Copenhagen was set on fire, destroying seven large paintings. Trampedach himself barely escaped the flames. Trampedach claimed that the fire in Copenhagen had been an attempt at his life by jealous colleagues. Some people claimed that he had started the fire himself, but in 2005 a French-Moroccan was sentenced for the crime in France, although the Copenhagen fires continue unresolved. After the fires he was struck by a severe depression and did not paint for the last years of his life.

Kurt Trampedach died at his home at Sare, Pyrénées-Atlantiques at the age of 70.

== Museums ==
Trampedach's art is represented at the following Danish museums:

- Statens Museum for Kunst
- Vejle Kunstmuseum
- Fyns Kunstmuseum
- Nordjyllands Kunstmuseum
- Kunstmuseet Trapholt, Kolding
- Skive Kunstmuseum
- Randers Kunstmuseum
- ARoS Aarhus Kunstmuseum
