= Sunny von Bülow =

American heiress, socialite, and philanthropist (1931–2008)

- Born: Martha Sharp Crawford; September 1, 1931; Manassas, Virginia, U.S.
- Died: December 6, 2008 (aged 77); New York City, U.S.
- Occupation: Socialite
- Spouses: Prince Alfred von Auersperg (m. 1957; div. 1965) Claus von Bülow (m. 1966; div. 1987)
- Children: 3, including Cosima von Bülow Pavoncelli
- Father: George Crawford

Martha Sharp "Sunny" von Bülow (née Crawford; September 1, 1931 − December 6, 2008) was an American heiress and socialite. Her second husband, Claus von Bülow, was convicted in 1982 of attempting to murder her by insulin overdose, but the conviction was overturned on appeal. A second trial found him not guilty, after experts opined that there was no insulin injection and that her symptoms were attributable to overuse of prescription drugs. The story was dramatized in the book and film Reversal of Fortune. Sunny von Bülow lived almost 28 years in a persistent vegetative state, from December 1980 until her death in a New York City nursing home on December 6, 2008.

== Early life ==
She was the only child of utilities magnate George Crawford (a former chairman of Columbia Gas & Electric Company) and his wife, Annie-Laurie Warmack. She was born on her father's personal railway carriage in Manassas, Virginia, en route from Hot Springs, Virginia, to New York, for which she was known as "Choo-Choo" as a child before being nicknamed "Sunny" because of her nature.

Upon her father's death, when she was three years old, she inherited a reported US$100 million. Her mother, the daughter of the founder of the International Shoe Company, later married Russell Aitken, a sculptor and writer.

== Personal life ==
On July 20, 1957, Sunny married Prince Alfred Eduard Friedrich Vincenz Martin Maria Auersperg. He came from a very distinguished Austrian princely family that once ruled over the Principality of Auersperg, but due to the collapse of the Austrian Empire, his family became relatively impoverished. Sunny and Alfred met while he was her tennis instructor in a Swiss resort.

They had two children together:

- Annie-Laurie Ala von Auersperg (born 1958), co-founder of the National Center for Victims of Crime, who married financier Ralph H. Isham, son of diplomat Heyward Isham.
- Alexander Georg von Auersperg (born 1959), co-founder of the National Center for Victims of Crime, who married investment banker Nancy Louise Weinberg.

The Auerspergs were divorced in 1965. At that time, Sunny's net worth was over $75 million. Alfred Auersperg died in 1992 after lingering in an irreversible coma for nine years following a 1983 car accident in Austria.

On June 6, 1966, Sunny married Claus von Bülow, a former aide to oilman J. P. Getty, at the Brick Presbyterian Church in New York City. His maternal grandfather, whose surname he took, was Frits Toxwerdt von Bülow, Justice Minister of Denmark in the government of Klaus Berntsen (1910–1913) and also came from a noble background.

Together, they had a daughter:

- Cosima von Bülow (born 1967), who married Count Riccardo Pavoncelli.

By 1979, significant stresses and tensions had developed in their marriage, and both Sunny and Claus spoke openly about the possibility of a divorce.

== 1979 incident ==
On December 26, 1979, after the family had come together for Christmas at their Newport, Rhode Island mansion, she was found unresponsive and was rushed to the hospital where she slipped into a coma, but was revived. After days of testing, doctors determined the coma was the result of low blood sugar and diagnosed her as hypoglycemic, warning her against overindulging on sweets or going too long without eating. While no foul play was suspected at the time, Claus von Bülow was later accused of causing this incident by injecting her with insulin. In April 1980, she was again hospitalized after appearing incoherent and disoriented; their doctors reconfirmed she suffered from reactive hypoglycemia. She was advised to maintain control of the hypoglycemia by following a strict diet, limiting her sugar intake, and avoiding alcohol.

== 1980 incident ==
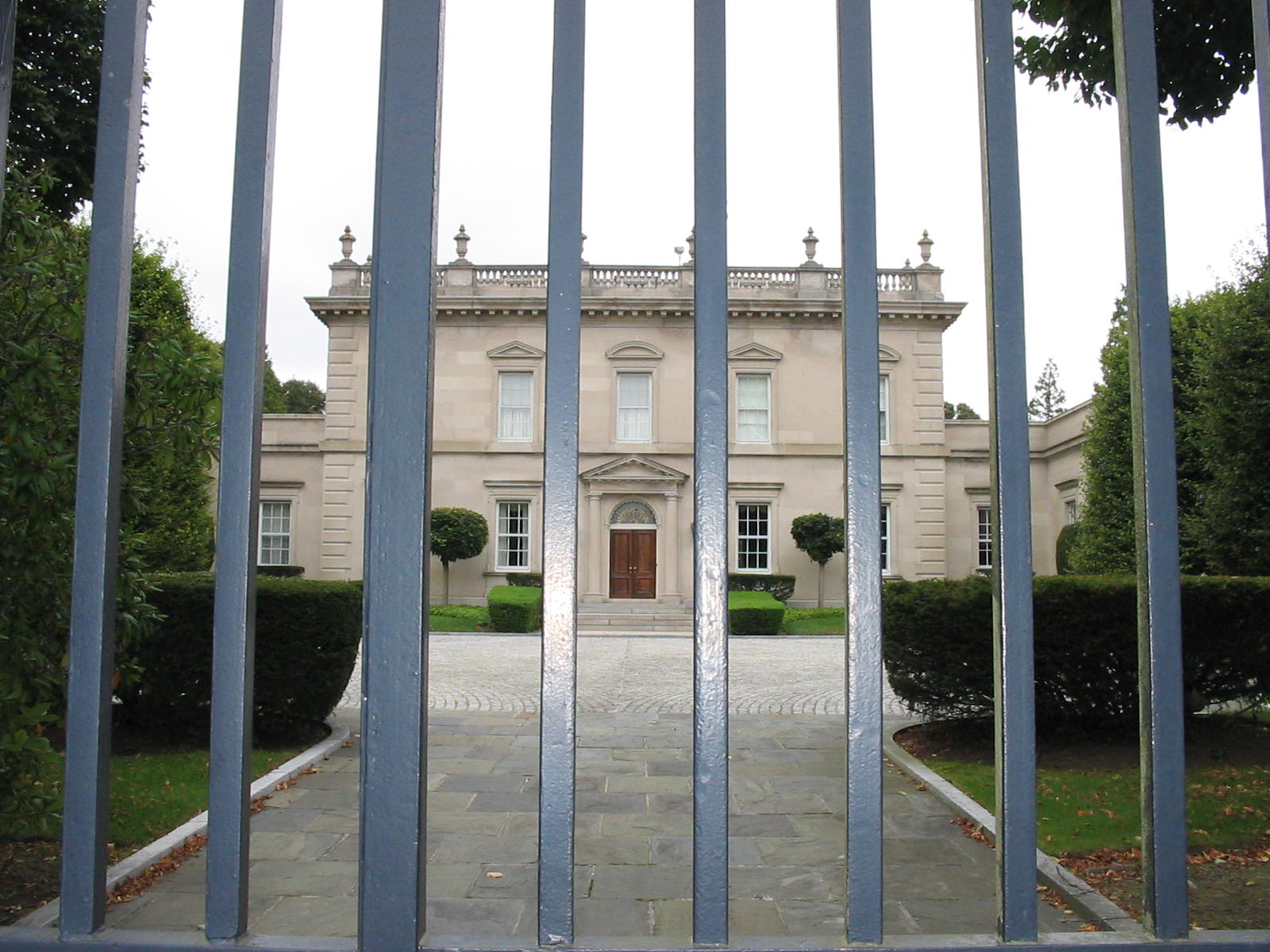
Clarendon Court in Newport, Rhode Island

On the evening of December 21, 1980, while celebrating Christmas with her family at their mansion, Clarendon Court, in Newport, Rhode Island, she again displayed confusion and lack of coordination. She was put to bed by her family, but in the morning she was discovered unconscious on the bathroom floor. She was taken to the hospital where it became clear that this time she had suffered severe enough brain injury to produce a persistent vegetative state. Although clinical features resembled a drug overdose, some of the laboratory evidence suggested hypoglycemia. The Court of Appeal ordered disclosure of the notes taken by the Auersperg children's attorney. These showed that Claus von Bülow did not want to terminate life support, as had been alleged.

Because of the increased marital tensions between Claus and Sunny von Bülow in the fall of 1980, her children were suspicious that her brain injury was the result of foul play by him. Her two eldest children persuaded Richard H. Kuh, the former New York County District Attorney, to investigate the possibility Claus von Bülow had attempted the murder of their mother. After the gathering of evidence, Rhode Island prosecutors presented the case to a grand jury who returned an indictment, and in July 1981, he was charged with two counts of attempted murder.

=== First trial ===
The case attracted nationwide publicity in the United States. The trial began in February 1982. Evidence presented by the prosecution consisted of circumstantial evidence, imputation of financial motive, extensive testimony by various maids, including Maria Schrallhammer who was a prominent witness at both trials, chauffeurs, doctors, and personal exercise trainers, a black bag with drugs, and a used syringe, reported to contain traces of insulin, found in Claus von Bülow's mansion. There was much evidence of excessive use of sedatives, vitamins, and other drugs by her, including testimony of alcohol and substance abuse problems. Harvard endocrinologist George Cahill testified that he was convinced that her brain damage was the result of injected insulin. Claus von Bülow was convicted.

=== Appeal ===
Claus von Bülow hired Harvard law professor Alan Dershowitz for his appeal. Dershowitz's campaign to acquit him was assisted by the then-Harvard Law School student and later television personality Jim Cramer; Cramer felt then and later wrote publicly that von Bülow was "supremely guilty" of the crime. Dershowitz and his other attorneys produced evidence of Sunny von Bülow's excessive drug use, including testimony by both Truman Capote and Joanne Carson (second wife of Johnny Carson) and more than ten of Sunny's friends. Some of the expert witness testimony was excluded as hypothetical or hearsay. Additional expert witness testimony cast doubt on the validity of evidence that a syringe contained traces of insulin. The appeals court quashed the conviction on several grounds, including the appellate court's ruling that justice for the accused should override attorney–client privilege; and that therefore the notes taken by Kuh, the Auersperg children's attorney, should be disclosed. These notes called into question the credibility of her maid, Ms. Schrallhammer, who had been a key witness for the prosecution.

At the second trial the defense called nine medical experts, all world-renowned university professors, who testified that the two comas were not caused by insulin, but by a combination of ingested (not injected) drugs, alcohol, and her chronic health conditions. The experts were John Caronna (vice chairman of neurology, Cornell); Leo Dal Cortivo (former president, U.S. Toxicology Association); Ralph DeFronzo (medicine, Yale); Kurt Dubowski (forensic pathology, University of Oklahoma); Daniel Foster (medicine, University of Texas); Daniel Furst, (medicine, University of Iowa); Harold Lebovitz (director of clinical research, State University of New York); Vincent Marks (clinical biochemistry, Surrey, vice-president Royal College of Pathologists and president, Association of Clinical Biochemistry); and Arthur Rubinstein (medicine, University of Chicago).

Other experts testified that the hypodermic needle tainted with insulin on the outside (but not inside) would have been dipped in insulin but not injected (injecting it in flesh would have wiped it clean). Evidence also showed that her hospital admission three weeks before the final coma showed she had ingested at least 73 aspirin tablets, a quantity that could only have been self-administered, and which indicated her state of mind.

Cahill recanted his testimony from the first trial and opined that insulin was the most reasonable explanation for von Bülow's coma, but that "neither he nor anyone else could ever be 100 percent certain of the cause of the comas."

=== Aftermath ===
Sunny's family remained convinced that her husband had tried to murder her and was upset that Cosima had chosen to take her father's side. As a result, in 1981, Sunny's mother, Annie Laurie Aitken, disinherited Cosima, denying her share of the estate upon Aitken's death on May 4, 1984. In July 1985, ten days after Claus von Bülow was acquitted at his second trial, Ala and Alexander filed a $56 million civil lawsuit against him, on their mother's behalf. On December 24, 1987, this case was settled out of court when Claus von Bülow agreed to divorce her, give up all claims to her fortune, then estimated between $25 million and $40 million, and leave the country. In exchange, Cosima was reinstated in Aitken's will and received $30 million as her one-third share of the estate.

After the trials, Ala and Alexander founded the Sunny von Bülow National Victim Advocacy Center in Fort Worth, Texas, now the National Center for Victims of Crime in Washington, DC, and the Sunny von Bülow Coma and Head Trauma Research Foundation in New York.

=== Death ===
Sunny remained in a persistent vegetative state until her death from cardiopulmonary arrest on December 6, 2008, at Mary Manning Walsh Nursing Home in New York City. Her memorial service, given by her three children, was held on January 14, 2009, at the Brick Presbyterian Church in New York, which was the same church where the von Bülows married.

== In popular culture ==
- Alan Dershowitz, Claus's attorney, wrote a book about the case, Reversal of Fortune: Inside the von Bülow Case (New York, Random House 1986 and London, Penguin Books 1991).
- The 1990 film Reversal of Fortune was based on Dershowitz's books about the case, with Glenn Close playing Sunny and Jeremy Irons playing Claus von Bülow, a performance for which he was awarded an Academy Award for Best Actor.
- Bill Kurtis narrated an episode of the series American Justice titled "Von Bulow: A Wealth of Evidence".
- The American television series Biography produced and aired a documentary episode titled "Claus von Bülow: A Reasonable Doubt", with interviews of Claus Von Bülow and Alan Dershowitz.
- The case is referenced in the Seinfeld episode "The Suicide". Jerry Seinfeld is in a hospital room watching over a comatose neighbor. To the neighbor's ex-girlfriend he remarked, "It's not like a Sunny Von Bülow coma. Doctor said he should snap out of it anytime."
- Sunny is referenced in the American television show Will & Grace, in which socialite Karen Walker asks more than once about Sunny being “out of bed.”
