= Randers Museum of Art =

Coordinates: 56°27′38″N 10°02′27″E

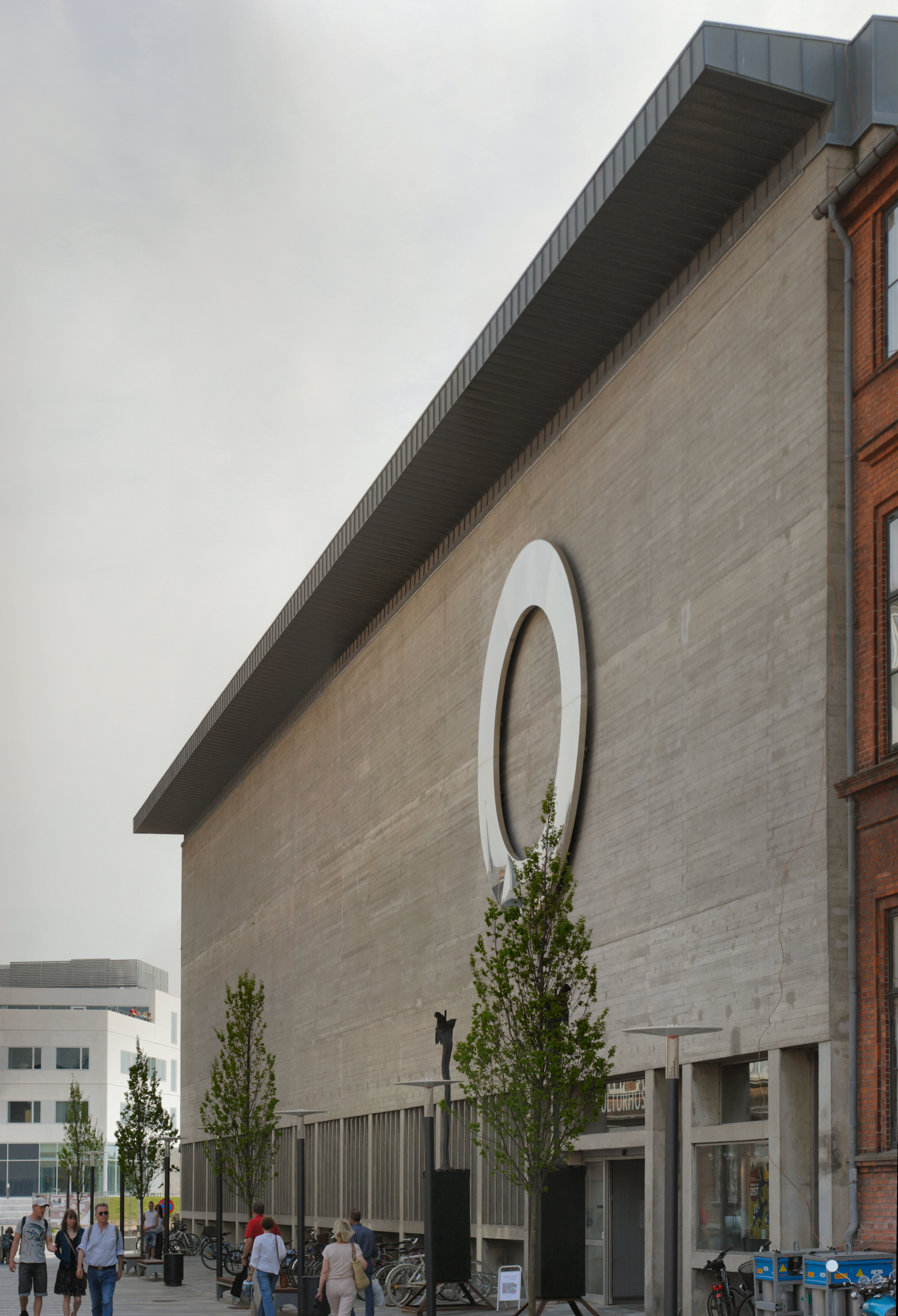
Kulturhuset, including Randers Museum of Art.

Randers Museum of Art (Danish: Randers Kunstmuseum) is a Danish art museum in Randers in northeastern Jutland, Denmark. The museum is located in the cultural centre of Kulturhuset (The House of Culture) in the town centre and displays many of the major works of Danish painters, especially those of the 19th and 20th centuries.

== Collection ==
Founded in 1887, the museum has a collection of over 4,000 paintings, including works by the Danish masters Christoffer Wilhelm Eckersberg, Christen Købke, Vilhelm Hammershøi and L.A. Ring as well as those of many other notable painters. Among the 20th-century artists represented are Vilhelm Lundstrøm, Wilhelm Freddie and Asger Jorn.

The Golden Age of Danish Painting is well represented, in particular with works by Købke, Nicolai Abildgaard, Jens Juel, Eckersberg, Wilhelm Marstrand, Johan Lundbye, P. C. Skovgaard and Vilhelm Kyhn. Danish Naturalism from the end of the 19th century is represented by the masterpieces of L.A. Ring, Theodor Philipsen, Vilhelm Hammershøi, Agnes Slott-Møller and Jens Ferdinand Willumsen. Representatives of early Modernism and Surrealism include Harald Giersing, Edvard Weie, William Scharff, Karl Isakson, Jais Nielsen, Wilhelm Freddie and Vilhelm Bjerke-Petersen. Painters in the contemporary collection from the 1970s include Kurt Trampedach, Anders Kierkegaard, Hans Christian Rylander, Henrik Ipsen, Jørgen Haugen Sørensen, Claus Carstensen, Erik A. Frandsen, Berit Jensen, Søren Dahlgaard and Peter Carlsen.

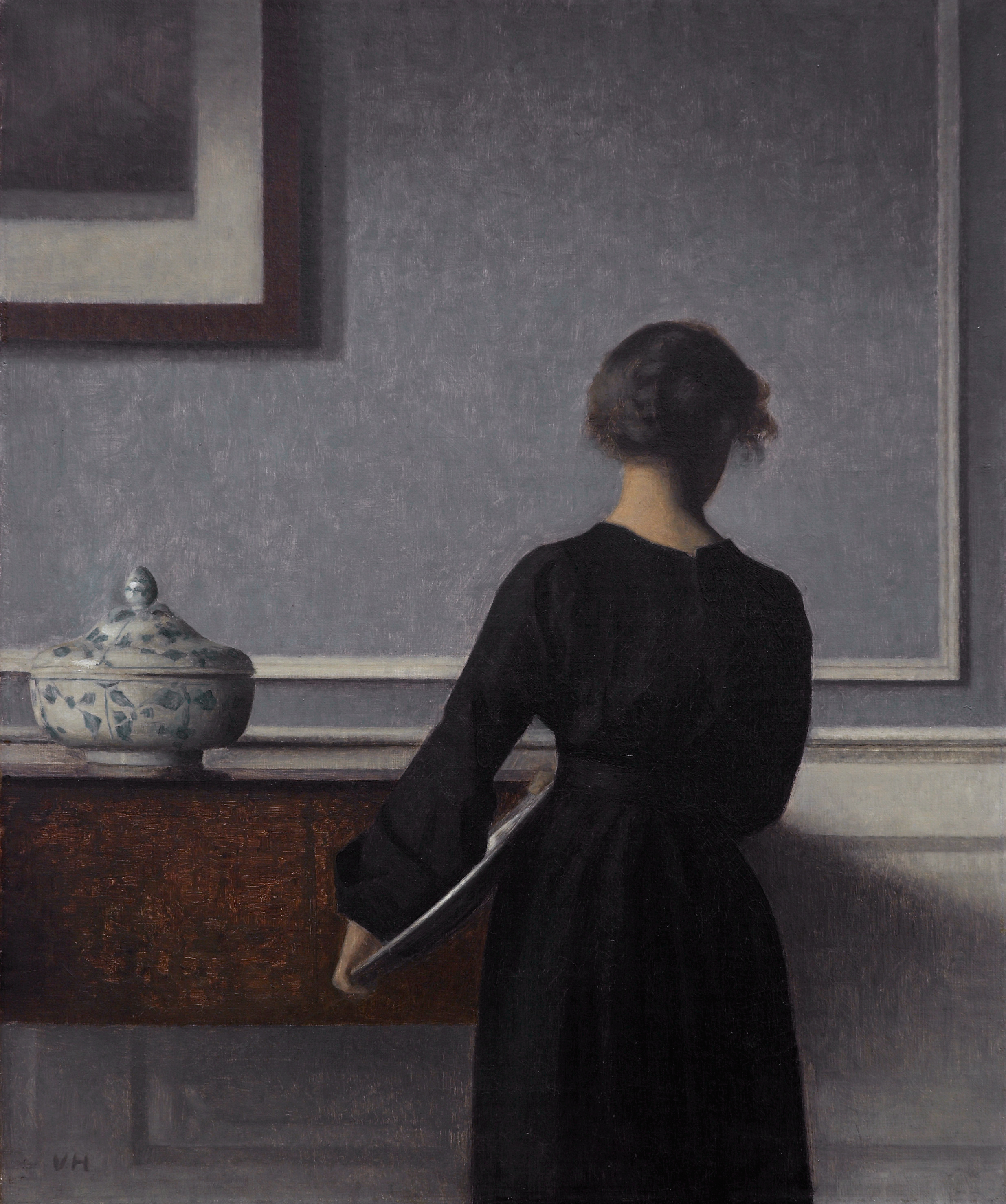
Interior with Young Woman Seen from the Back, Vilhelm Hammershøi

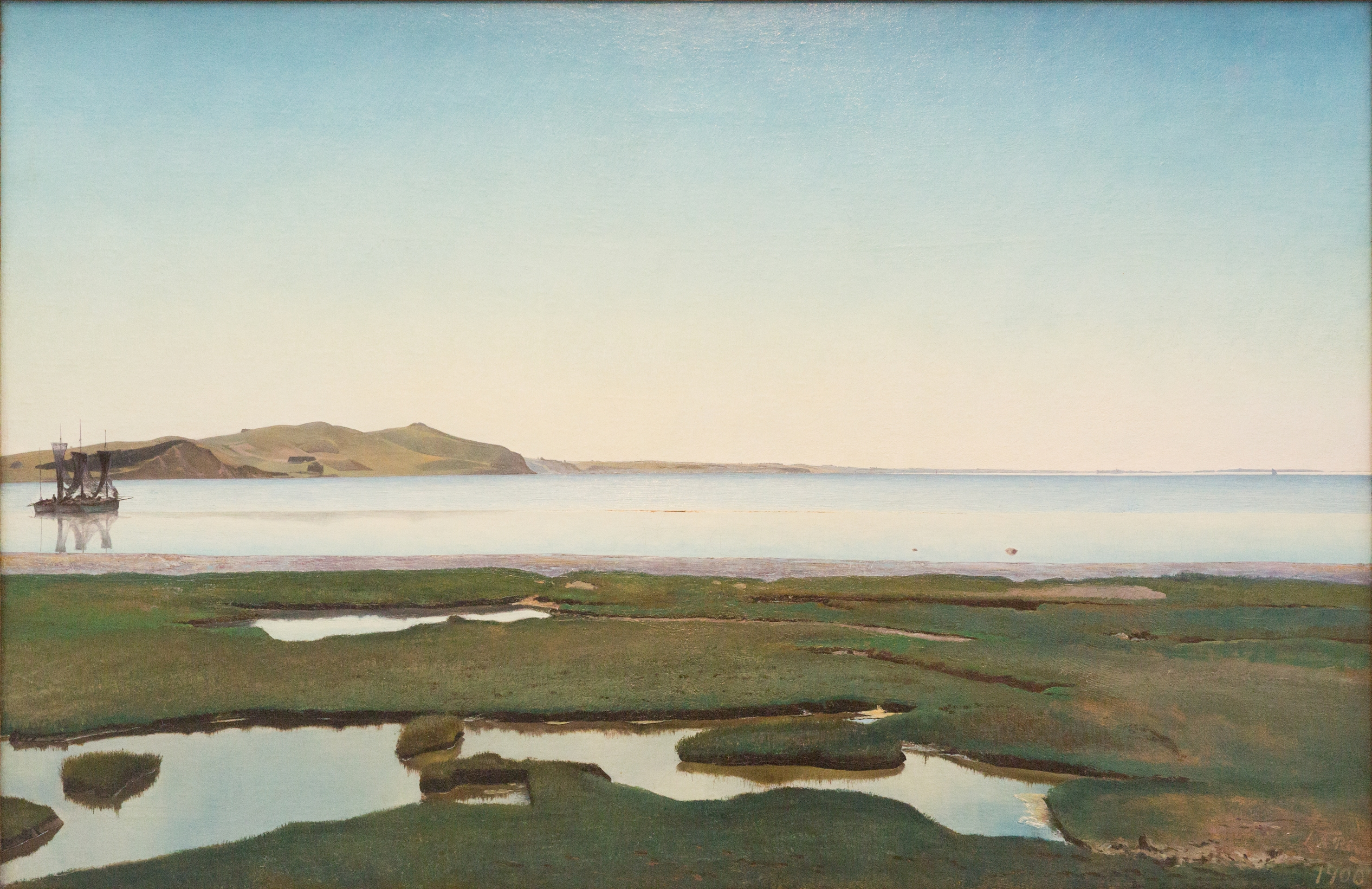
Sommerdag ved Roskilde Fjord, L.A. Ring

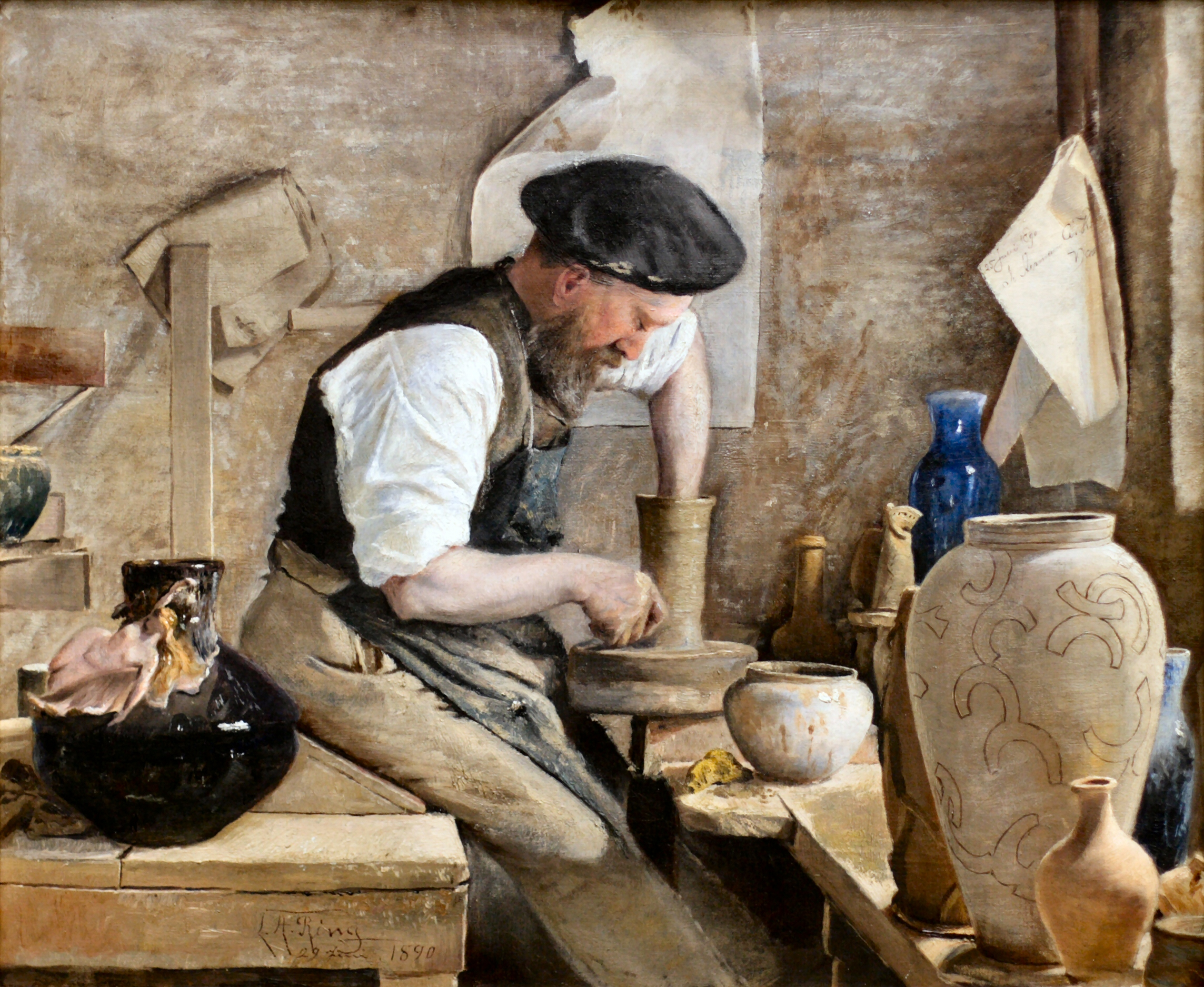
Herman Kähler i sit værksted, L.A. Ring

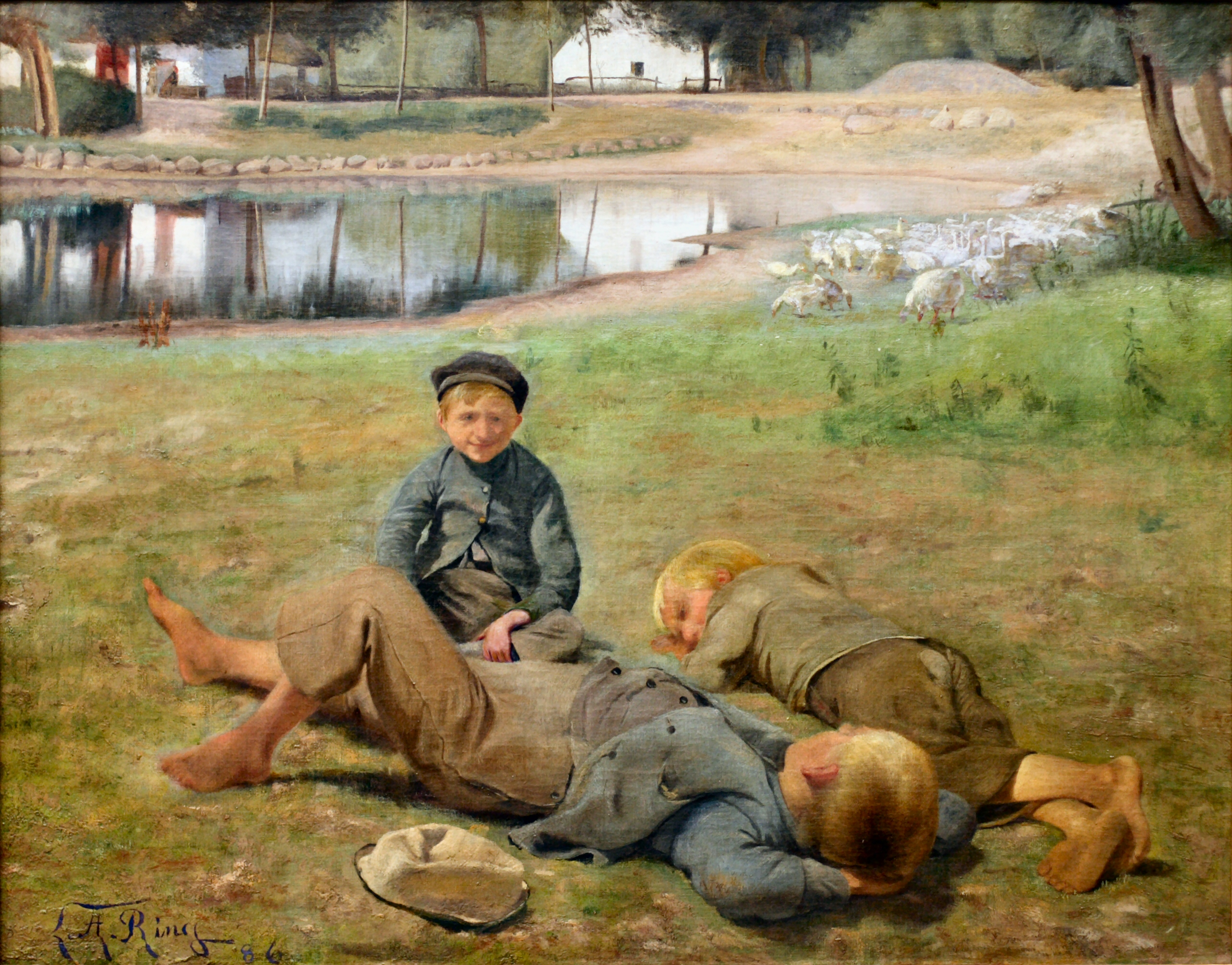
Gåsevogterne ved gadekæret i landsbyen, L.A. Ring

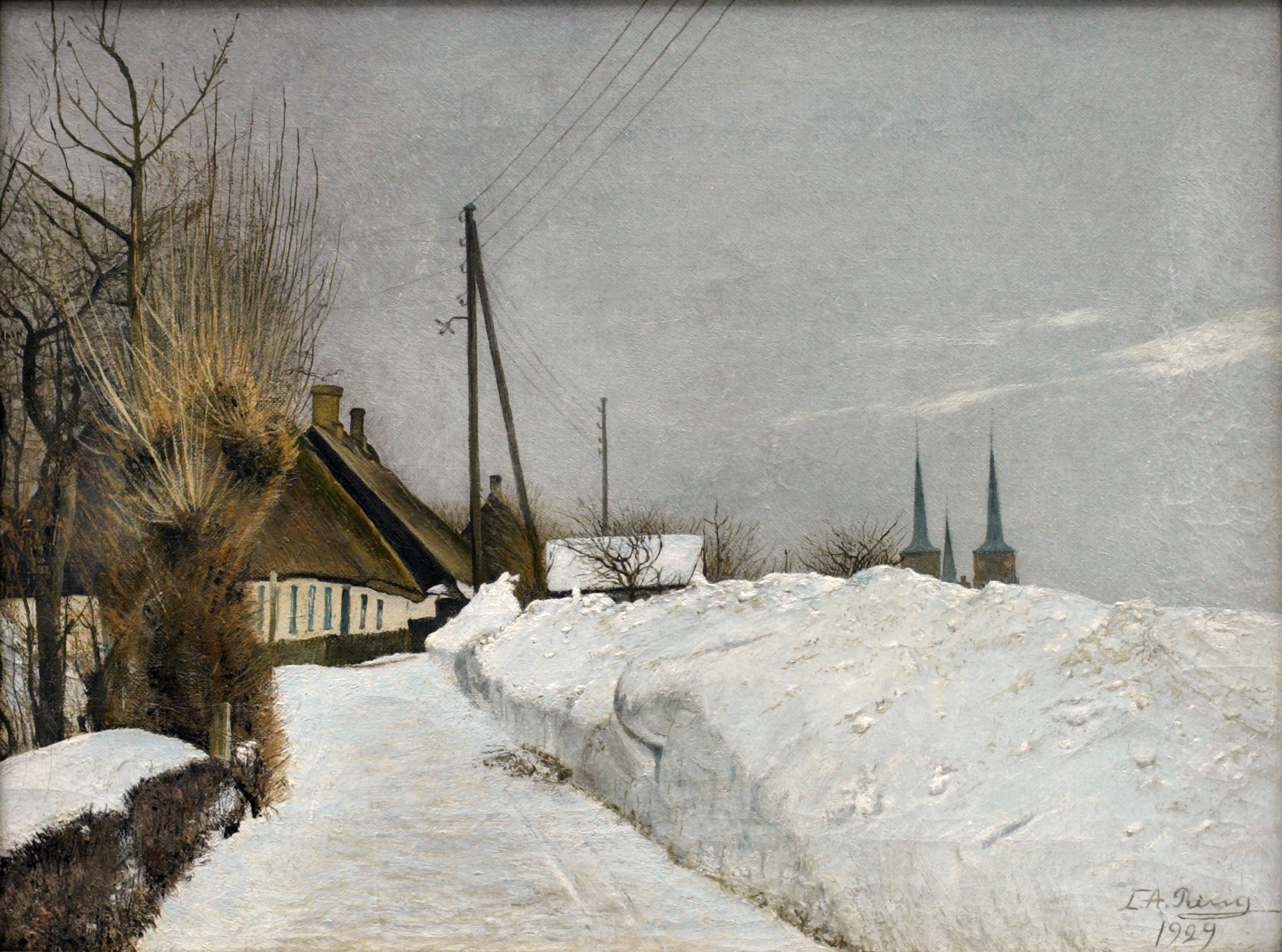
Vinterdag i Roskilde, L.A. Ring

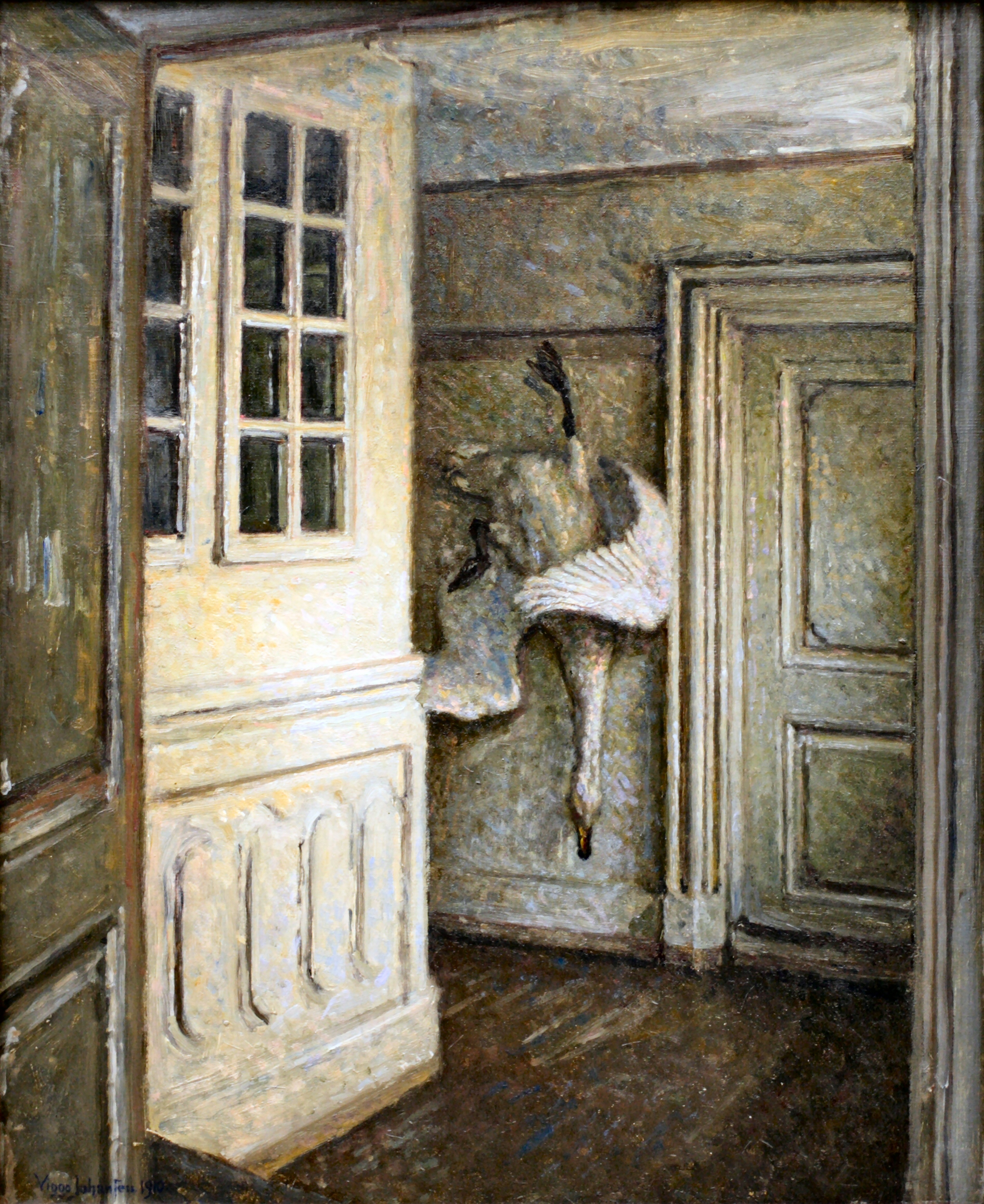
Interiør med død svane, V. Johansen (1910)

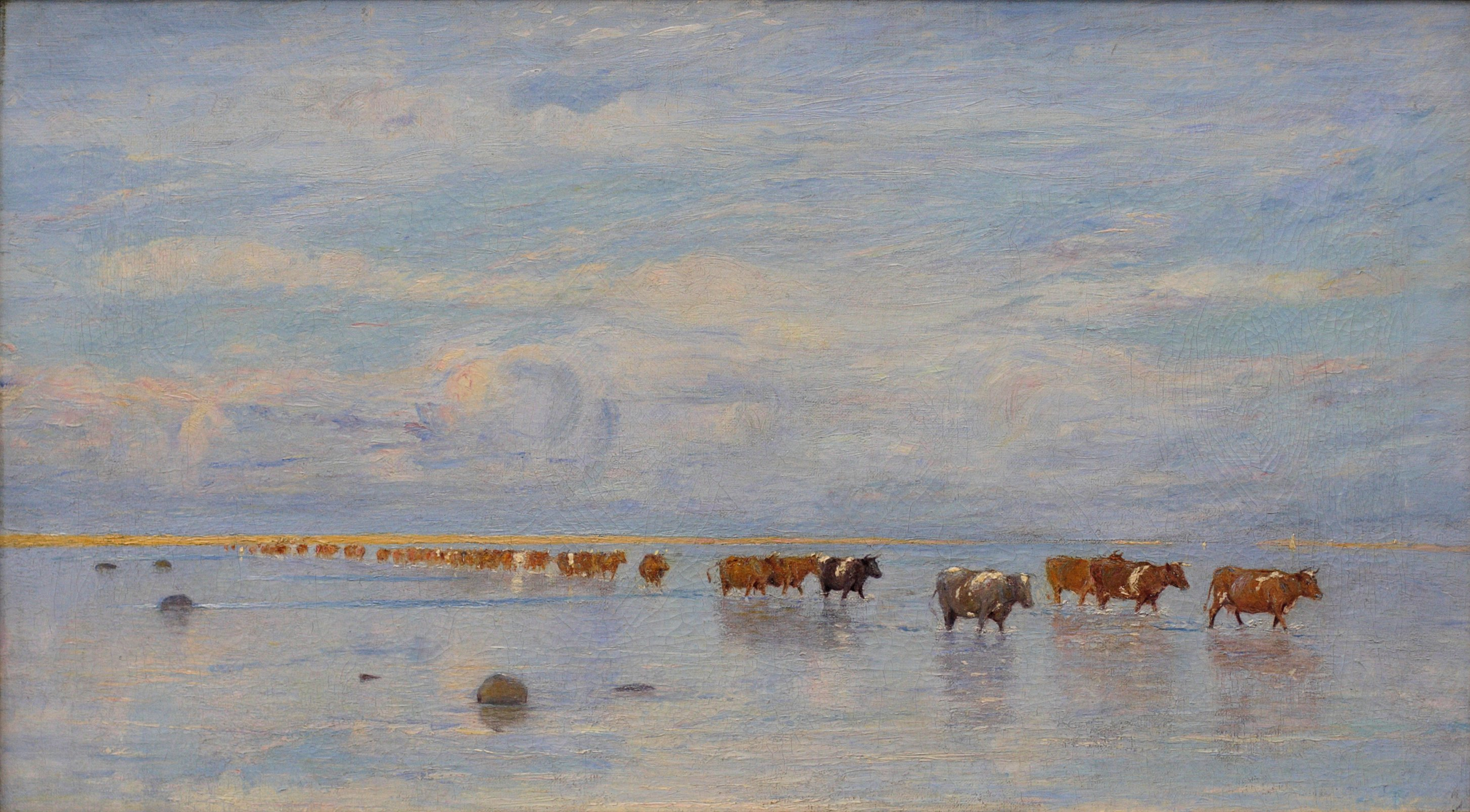
Køer, Saltholm, Theodor Philipsen (c. 1890)

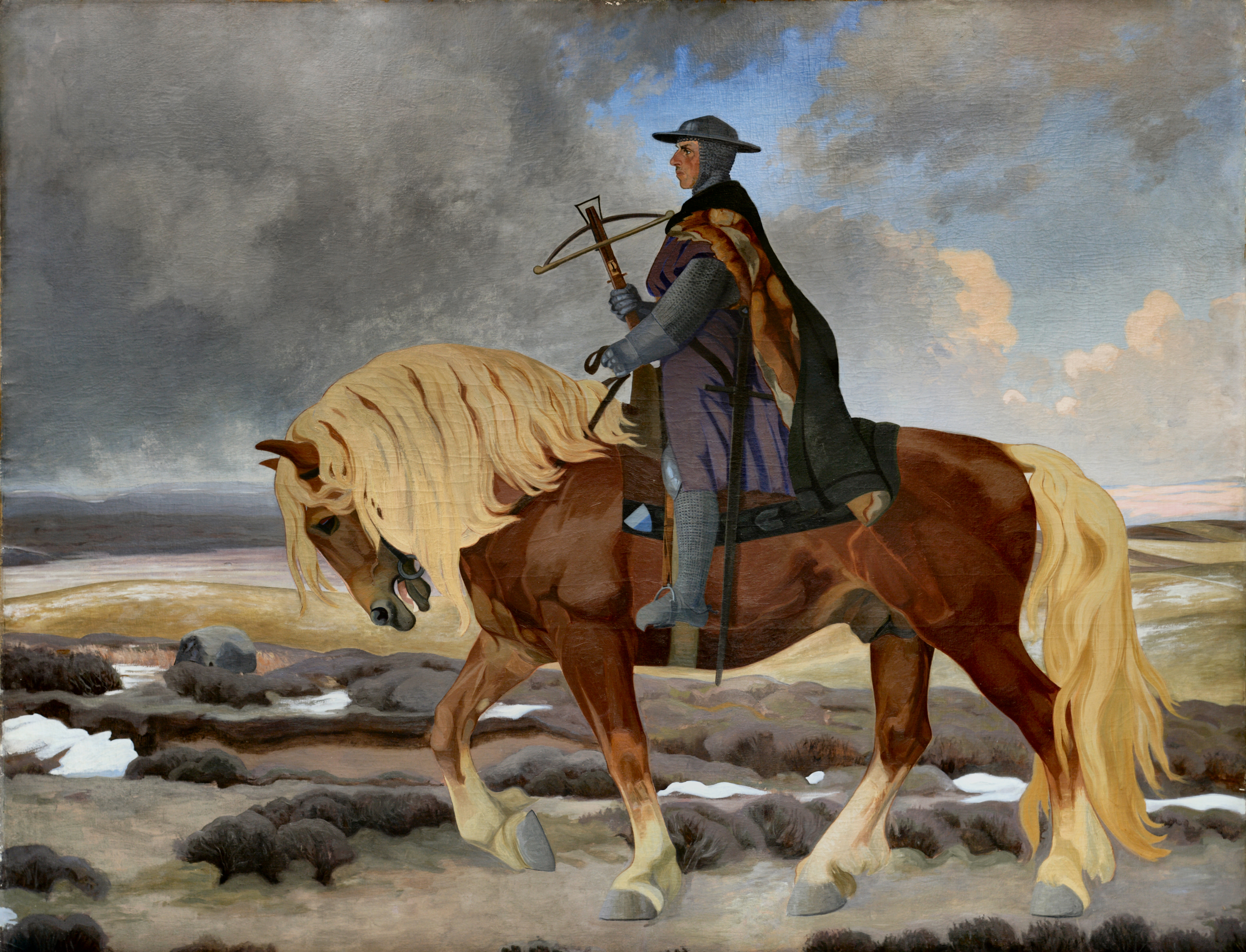
Niels Ebbesen, Agnes Slott-Møller (1890s)

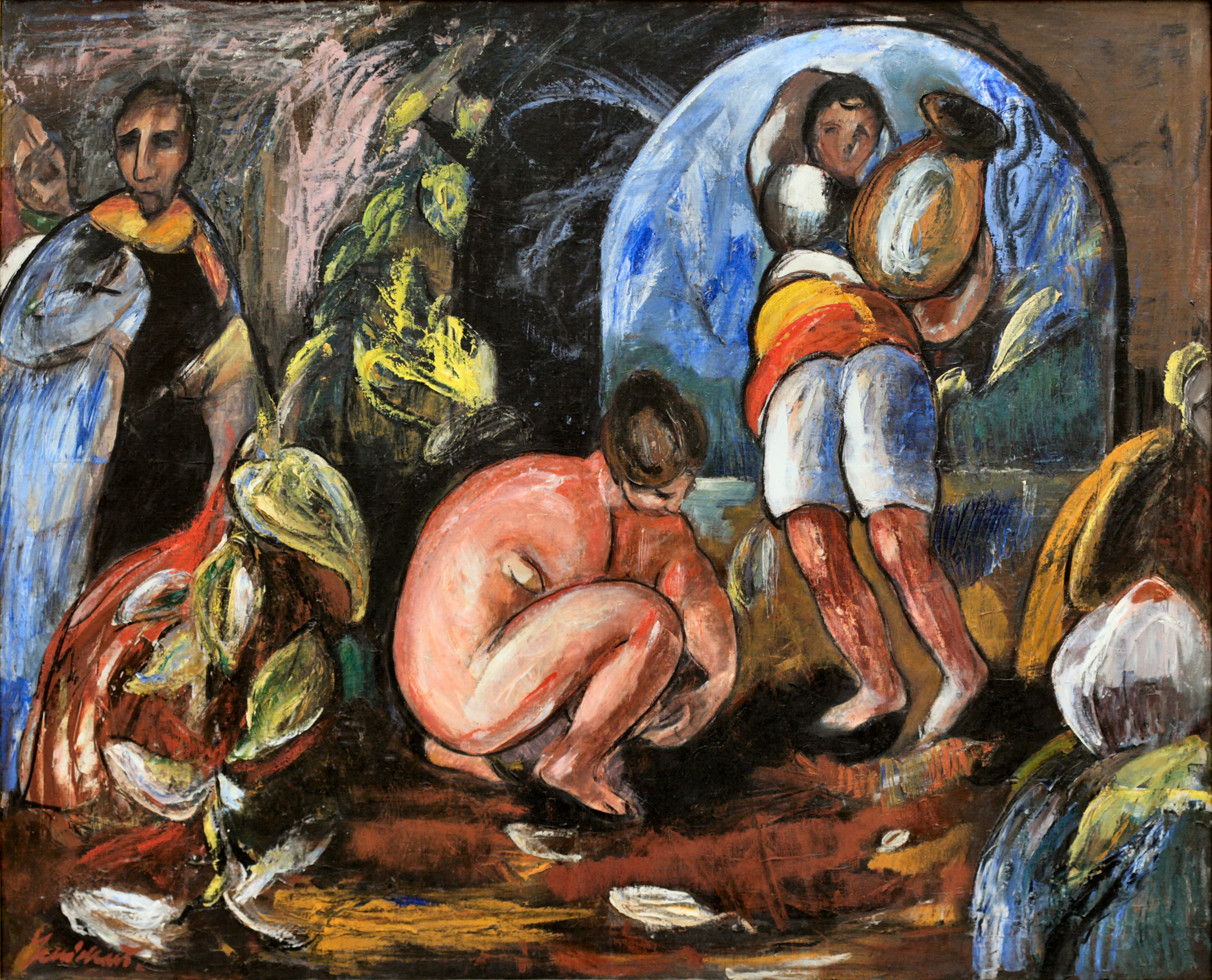
Susanne i badet, J.A. Jerichau (1916)

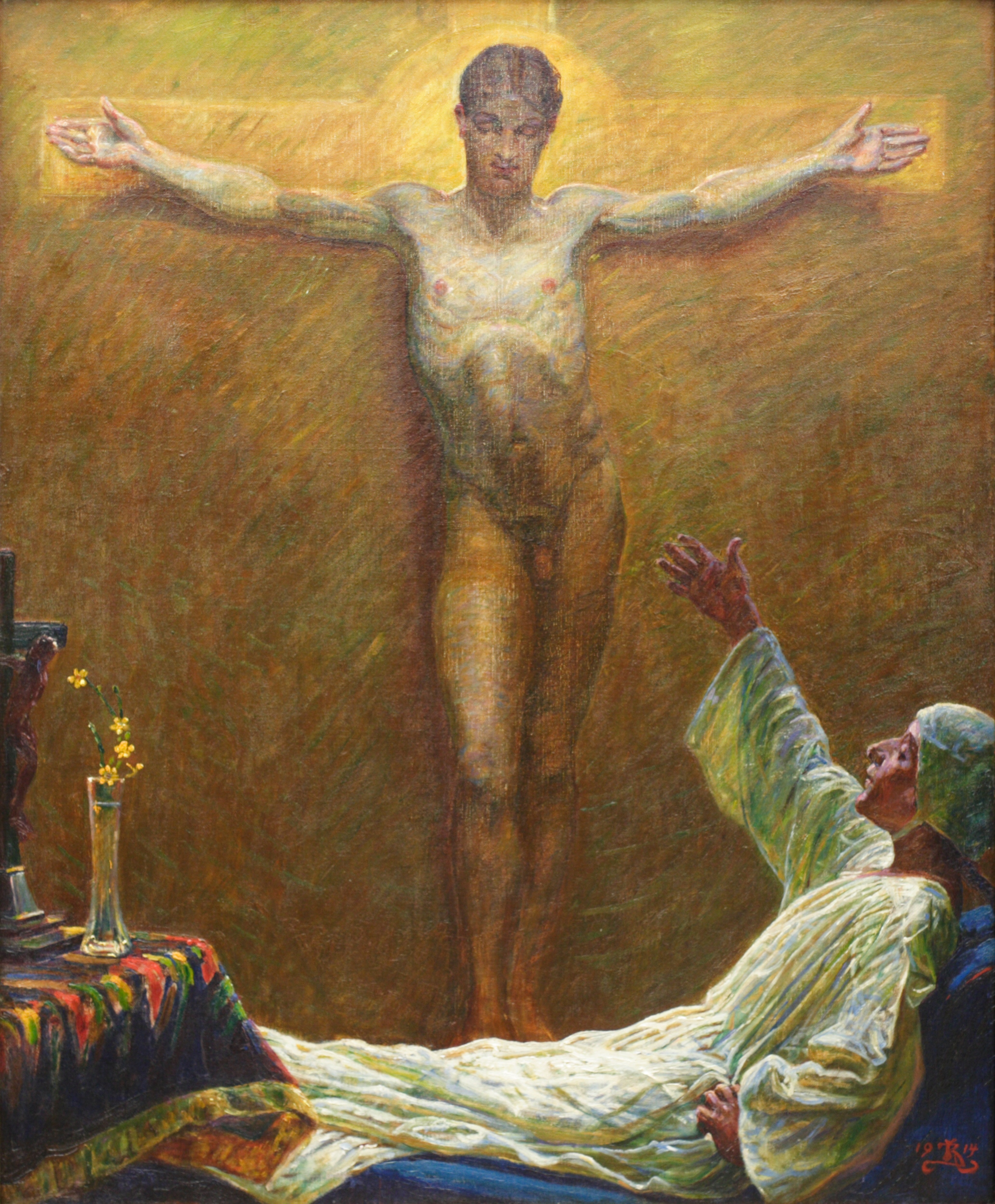
Den Hellige Katharina af Sienna, Kristian Zahrtmann (1914)

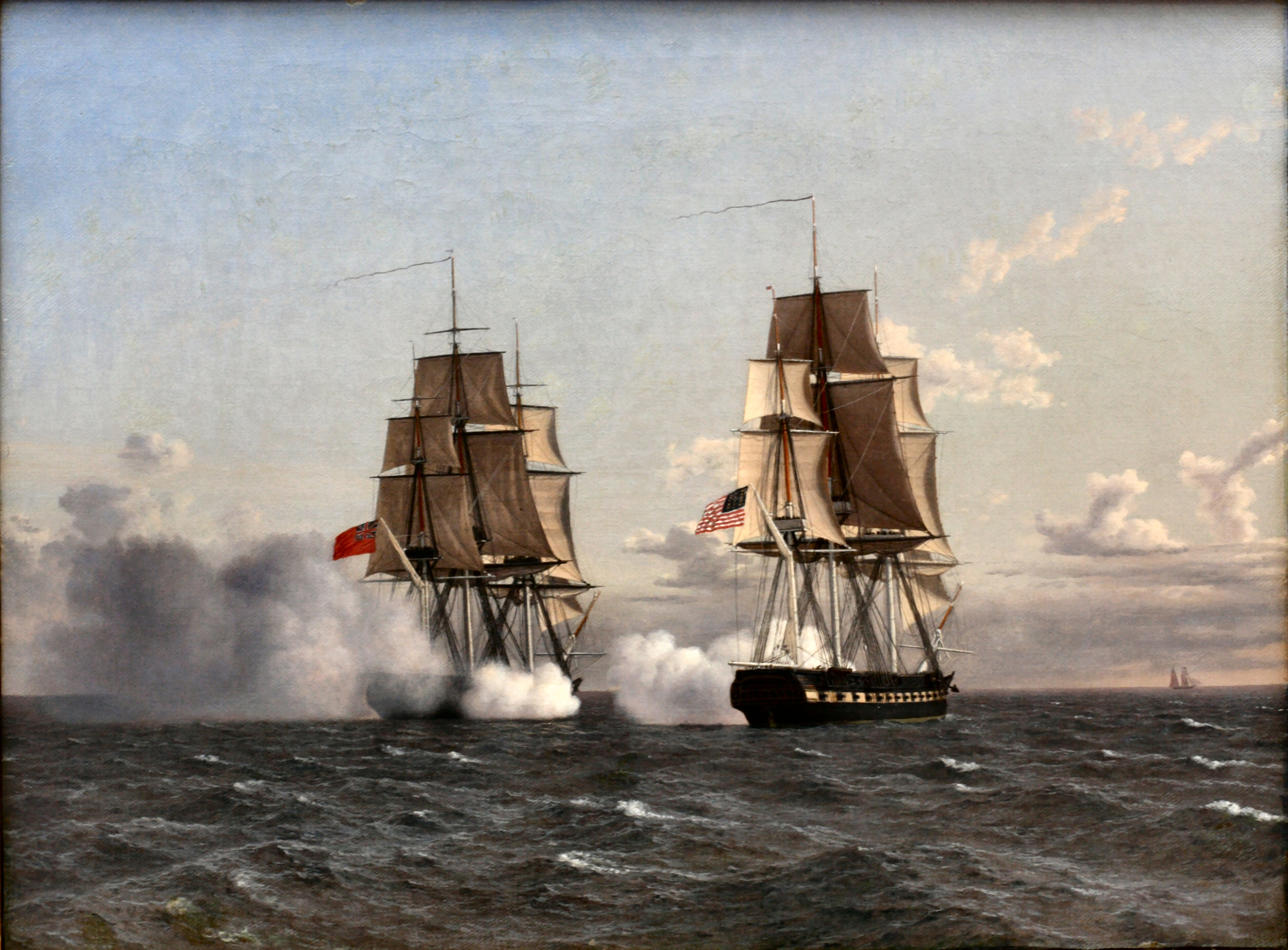
Kamp mellem den engelske fregat Shannon og den amerikanske fregat Chesapeak, C.W. Eckersberg (1836)

== Future plans ==
Randers Museum of Art is housed in the cultural centre of Kulturhuset (The House of Culture), designed by the architect Flemming Lassen and opened in 1969. In February 2009, the Danish company 3XN won a competition for building new premises for the art museum. The new building was designed as a transition between town and countryside, art and nature. Covering an area of 7,550 m^{2} (81,300 sq ft), it was to house three exhibition galleries, an auditorium, a café and a shop. Efforts to raise some DKK 250 million for the project have however not been successful. In September 2012, it was announced the ambitious project would not go ahead, consideration being given instead to an extension of the existing building.

== Opening times ==
Located at Stemannsgade 2, 2, Randers, the museum collection is open to visitors free of charge from 10 am to 4 pm, Tuesday to Sunday (and until 8 pm on the last Wednesday each month). Closed from 24 to 26 December, 31 December, 1 January, 1 May and 5 June.
