= Sommerdag ved Roskilde Fjord =

1900 painting by L. A. Ring

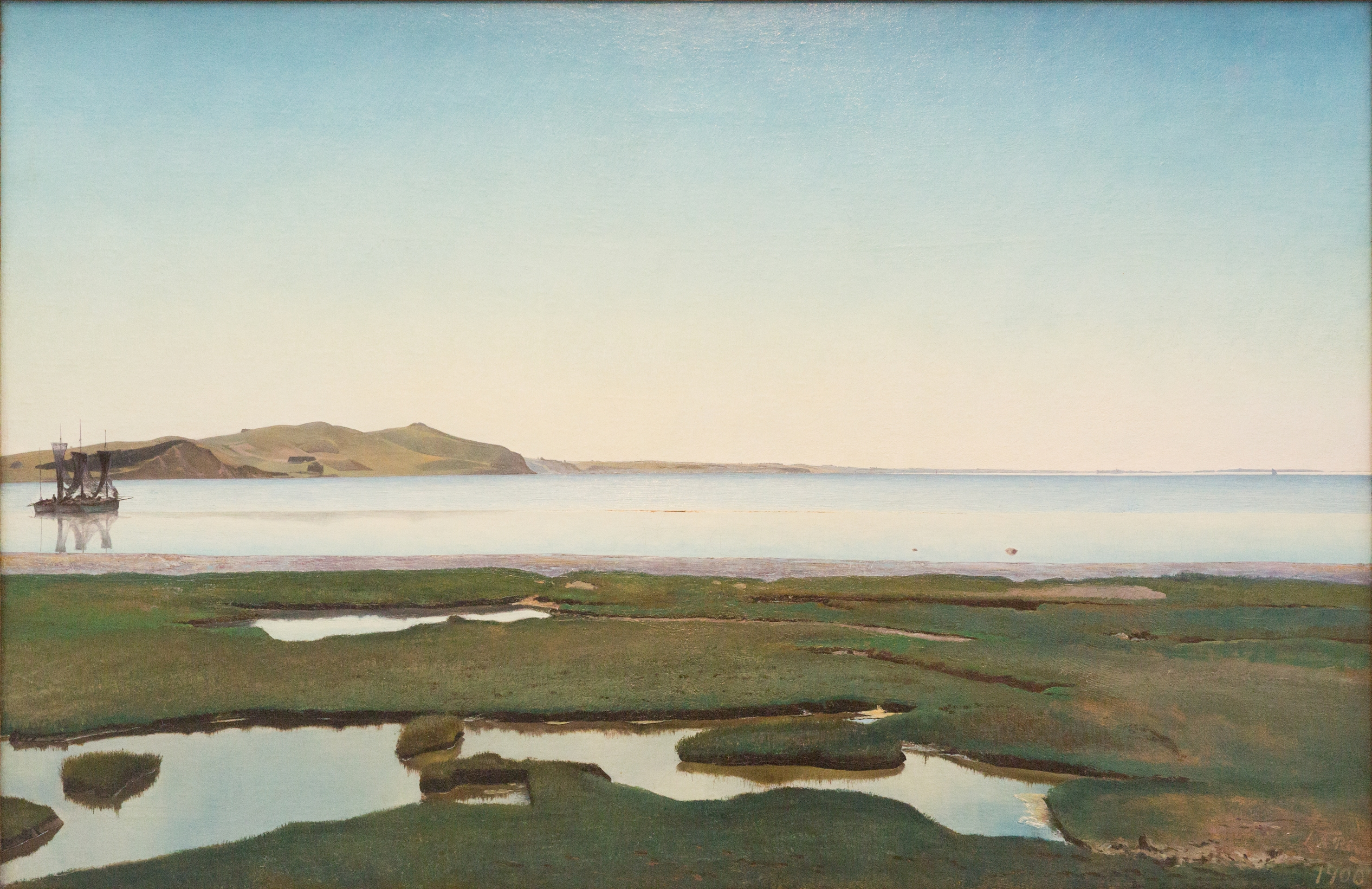
L.A. Ring: Sommerdag ved Roskilde Fjord (1900)

Sommerdag ved Roskilde Fjord (Summer Day by Roskilde Fjord) is an oil painting by the Danish artist L. A. Ring from 1900. Considered to be one of the masterpieces of Danish culture, it was included in the 2006 Danish Culture Canon. It is displayed in the Randers Museum of Art.

== Description ==
The painting depicts the hilly green landscape and the flat marshy area bordering Roskilde Fjord in western Zealand. The water is calm reflecting a group of fishing boats and the bluish tints of the sky. The scene is bathed in light, possibly symbolising a sense of infinity. Ring provides a panoramic view of the scene, drawing the eyes to the horizon and beyond, paving the way for sensual interpretations.

== Interpretation ==
The art historian Finn Terman Frederiksen believes that while the painting provides an extremely accurate rendering of the scene during an unusually warm period in August 1900, it can also be interpreted as symbolising the cycle of life from night to day, from death to life and, perhaps also, Ring's own rebirth after his marriage to Sigrid Kähler. It thus combines Realism with Symbolism, the driving forces behind Ring's work.
