= National Center for Victims of Crime =

American nonprofit organization

- Abbreviation: NCVC
- Formation: 1985; 41 years ago
- Founders: Ala Isham, Alexander Auersperg
- Tax ID no.: 30-0022798
- Legal status: 501(c)(3) nonprofit organization
- Purpose: To forge a national commitment to help victims of crime rebuild their lives.
- Headquarters: Landover, Maryland, U.S.
- Coordinates: 38.9572914°N 76.8919331°W
- Board Chair: Ronald Long
- Chief Executive Officer: Renee E. Williams
- Subsidiaries: Victim Policy Institute (501(c)(4))
- Revenue: $4,341,911 (2023)
- Expenses: $4,154,372 (2023)
- Employees: 39 (2022)
- Volunteers: 25 (2022)
- Website: www.victimsofcrime.org

The National Center for Victims of Crime (NCVC) is an American 501(c)(3) nonprofit organization dedicated to providing information, resources, and advocacy for victims of all types of crime, as well as the people who serve them. The National Center for Victims of Crime hosts the annual National Training Institute, designed to share current research and effective policies with service providers, in order to advance the quality of services available to victims of crime.

== Programs ==
=== Annual conference ===
The National Center for Victims of Crime holds an annual National Training Institute. The National Training Institute is held in conjunction with the National Crime Victim Bar Association National Conference, "Civil Actions for Criminal Acts". The National Training Institute emphasizes a multidisciplinary approach to sharing promising practices, current research, and effective programs and policies that are victim-centered, practice-based, and research-informed. The National Training Institute is a forum for law enforcement, victim service professionals, allied practitioners, policymakers, and researchers to share current developments and build new collaborations. Sessions will highlight practical information to better support services for the wide range of persons victimized by crimes of all types.

=== VictimConnect Resource Center ===
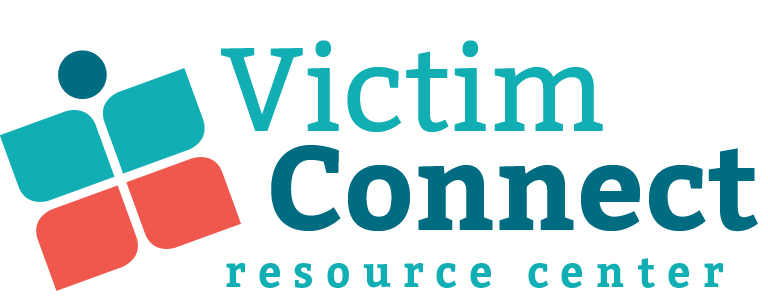

The VictimConnect Resource Center is a project funded by the Office for Victims of Crime and launched in July 2015. It is a place for victims of any crime to learn about their rights and options—confidentially and compassionately. VictimConnect can be accessed anywhere in the United States through a phone and texting hotline available 8:30 am to 7:30 pm Eastern Time, and through online chat from 9:30 am to 6:30 pm Eastern Time.

Staffers of the helpline are called victim assistance specialists, and they have specialized training in helping victims connect with resources, access referrals, and craft next steps to regain control over their lives. Both English and Spanish speakers are available and the program has access to interpreters for over 200 languages. Additionally, VictimConnect has a Senior Services Program to assist senior victims of abuse or financial fraud. Senior services staff have been specifically trained to provide referrals, community resources, and additional support to prevent and increase awareness of elder abuse.

=== Tribal Resource Tool ===
The Tribal Resource Tool is a web-based, community centered resource mapping tool that connects Native American victims and survivors of crime and abuse to over 1,000 local, trauma-informed and verified resources in their community. This tool also identifies gaps in victim services so those can be addressed. It was created with funds from the Department of Justice's Office for Victims of Crime in partnership with the National Congress of American Indians and the Tribal Law and Policy Institute.

=== Training and Technical Assistance ===
The National Center provides Training and Technical Assistance through Victim Assistance to Support Tribes (VAST) and Project Safe Neighborhoods. Project Safe Neighborhoods is a Department of Justice funded project that matches Training and Technical Assistance providers with selected field sites. The National Center evaluates field site's Victim Service Units, conducts joint analyses with partner organizations and hosts training on subjects, such as Domestic Violence and Firearms.

=== DC Victim Hotline ===
The DC Victim Hotline officially launched on October 1, 2015. It is funded by the District of Columbia Office of Victim Services. It is the only citywide hotline providing free, confidential local resources for victims of all types of crime in the District of Columbia. The hotline operates 24 hours a day, 7 days a week, is free and confidential. It provides an access point for victims of any crime to access assistance. The Victim Assistance Specialists staffing the hotline build connections with community partners through networking and cross-training. They provide basic crisis-intervention and referrals to community organizations.

=== Legislative advocacy and lobbying ===
The National Center for Victims of Crime supported the Elder Abuse Prevention and Protection Act of 2017, which increased professional training for federal investigators and prosecutors, designated prosecutors to handle cases of elder abuse in each federal judicial district, established elder justice coordinators in the U.S. Federal Trade Commission's Bureau of Consumer Protection and the U.S. Department of Justice, and increased penalties for perpetrators of elder abuse.

In December 2017, the National Center for Victims of Crime supported the Combat Online Predators Act, a bill to increase the maximum sentence in federal prison for stalking a minor. It was signed into law on December 22, 2020.

In January 2018, the National Center for Victims of Crime supported the Protecting Young Victims from Sexual Abuse and Safe Sport Authorization Act, to make it illegal for amateur athletics governing bodies to fail to report sex-abuse allegations to a law enforcement authority within 24 hours. It extended the civil statute of limitations for human trafficking and federal sex offenses. It required national governing bodies to develop and enforce methods to prevent, report, and respond to the abuse of child athletes. The bill was signed into law on February 14, 2018.

In February 2018, the National Center of Victims supported the Crime Amy, Vicky, and Andy Child Pornography Victim Assistance Act, which would provide a legal process for restitution for victims of child pornography in Connecticut.

=== Former ===
==== National Compassion Fund ====
Following the murders at Sandy Hook Elementary School, a movie theater in Aurora, a Sikh temple in Oak Creek, and Virginia Tech, the victims' families found that questions over the method of distributing charitable contributions caused them even more pain. Questions included how much should go to the family of each murdered victim, how much should go to survivors who witnessed the murders and will need years of therapy, and who should make these decisions. There were also significant delays in the distribution of donations and questions over whether the organization that collected the donations should retain a portion of the donations.

The National Center for Victims of Crime created the National Compassion Fund in order to establish a method and rubric for collecting and distributing donations to victims that could be set up quickly and distributed fairly following a mass shooting.

The National Compassion Fund collected charitable donations and distributed funds to victims of the 2014 Fort Hood shootings, 2015 Chattanooga shootings, 2016 Orlando nightclub shooting, 2017 Las Vegas shooting, the 2018 Stoneman Douglas High School shooting, 2018 Cincinnati shooting, the 2019 Aurora, Illinois shooting. the 2019 El Paso shooting, the 2021 Indianapolis FedEx shooting, the 2021 Atlanta spa shootings, the 2021 Oconomowoc Wisconsin shooting, and the 2021 West Hempstead shooting.

The National Compassion Fund was dissolved on January 1, 2024.

==== Stalking Resource Center ====

In 2000, the National Center for Victims of Crime partnered with the U.S. Department of Justice Office on Violence Against Women to create the Stalking Resource Center (SRC). Since its inception, the Stalking Resource Center has trained over 100,000 professionals who work with victims in the United States, the United Kingdom, and Germany and provided technical assistance to hundreds of communities seeking to enhance their response to stalking.

In January 2004, the National Center for Victims of Crime established the month of January as National Stalking Awareness Month in order to raise awareness of the crime of stalking.

The federal grant funding the Stalking Resource Center was awarded to a different nonprofit organization, AEquitas, effective October 1, 2017. AEquitas renamed it the Stalking Prevention, Awareness, and Resource Center (SPARC).

==== Critical Choices forums ====
After the terrorist attacks of September 11, 2001, the National Center for Victims of Crime held free forums to help survivors of victims decide whether to join the September 11th Victim Compensation Fund or seek damages in court. The forums included presentations on economic losses, non-economic losses, and civil litigation, followed by question-and-answer sessions.

== Funding ==
The National Center for Victims of Crime receives grants from government agencies. In 2023, 23% of its total revenue came from federal government grants.

Between October 1, 2022, and September 30, 2023, the National Center for Victims of Crime was awarded one $400,000 federal grant from the U.S. Department of Justice to develop a resource guide for National Crime Victims' Rights Week. It was also awarded a $852,294 grant from the District of Columbia to fund the DC Victim Hotline.

Between October 1, 2021, and September 30, 2022, the National Center for Victims of Crime was awarded one $1,500,000 federal grant from the U.S. Department of Justice to fund the VictimConnect Resource Center. It was also awarded a $763,350 grant from the District of Columbia to fund the DC Victim Hotline.

Between October 1, 2020, and September 30, 2021, the National Center for Victims of Crime was awarded two federal grants totaling $599,999 from the U.S. Department of Justice to fund a tribal victim services program and to fund a technical assistance for tribal governments program. It was also awarded a $727,842 grant from the District of Columbia to fund the DC Victim Hotline.

Between October 1, 2019, and September 30, 2020, the National Center for Victims of Crime was awarded one $1,337,875 in federal grant from the U.S. Department of Justice to fund the National Crime Victims Helpline. It was also awarded a $714,844 grant from the District of Columbia to fund the DC Victim Hotline.

== History ==
Martha "Sunny" von Bulow's husband was arrested and charged with attempting to murder her by insulin overdose that ended up resulting in an irreversible coma. Her husband was convicted, but the conviction was overturned on appeal. At a second trial, he was found not guilty.

At a national meeting of Mothers Against Drunk Driving, Alexander Auersperg, her son, met E. Gene Patterson, a co-chairman of a national victims' coalition. The two of them teamed up with Auersperg's sister Annie-Laurie and Morris Gurley, Sunny von Bulow's financial adviser, to form a new nonprofit organization with Patterson as director. The organization was named the Sunny von Bulow Victim Advocacy Center, and it opened in January 1986, in Fort Worth, Texas. Fort Worth was chosen because of its location in the center of the United States. Auersperg envisioned the organization to be a national information and referral organization for victim-advocate groups. Auersperg pledged $1.5 million to fund the organization during its first three years, with his hope that the organization would become self-supporting.

The organization was renamed the National Victim Center in 1987, and it became the National Center for Victims of Crime in December 1998.
