= Hans Christian Rylander =

Danish painter (1939–2021)

- Born: 4 April 1939; Copenhagen, Denmark
- Died: 23 December 2021 (aged 82); Nykøbing Falster, Denmark
- Education: Royal Danish Academy of Fine Arts
- Known for: Painting

Hans Christian Rylander (4 April 1939 – 23 December 2021) was a Danish painter, educated at the Royal Danish Academy of Fine Arts from 1965 to 1969. He used an expressive and surreal style, in the 70's and 80's with a critical edge towards society. Rylander exhibited his works at the Randers Museum of Art, at Storstrøms Kunstmuseum, and at Vejle Museum of Art. A major commission was the decoration in Christian IV's Supply Depot at Slotsholmen in Copenhagen. Rylander received the Eckersberg Medal in 1984.
