= Morten Stræde =

Danish sculptor (born 1956)

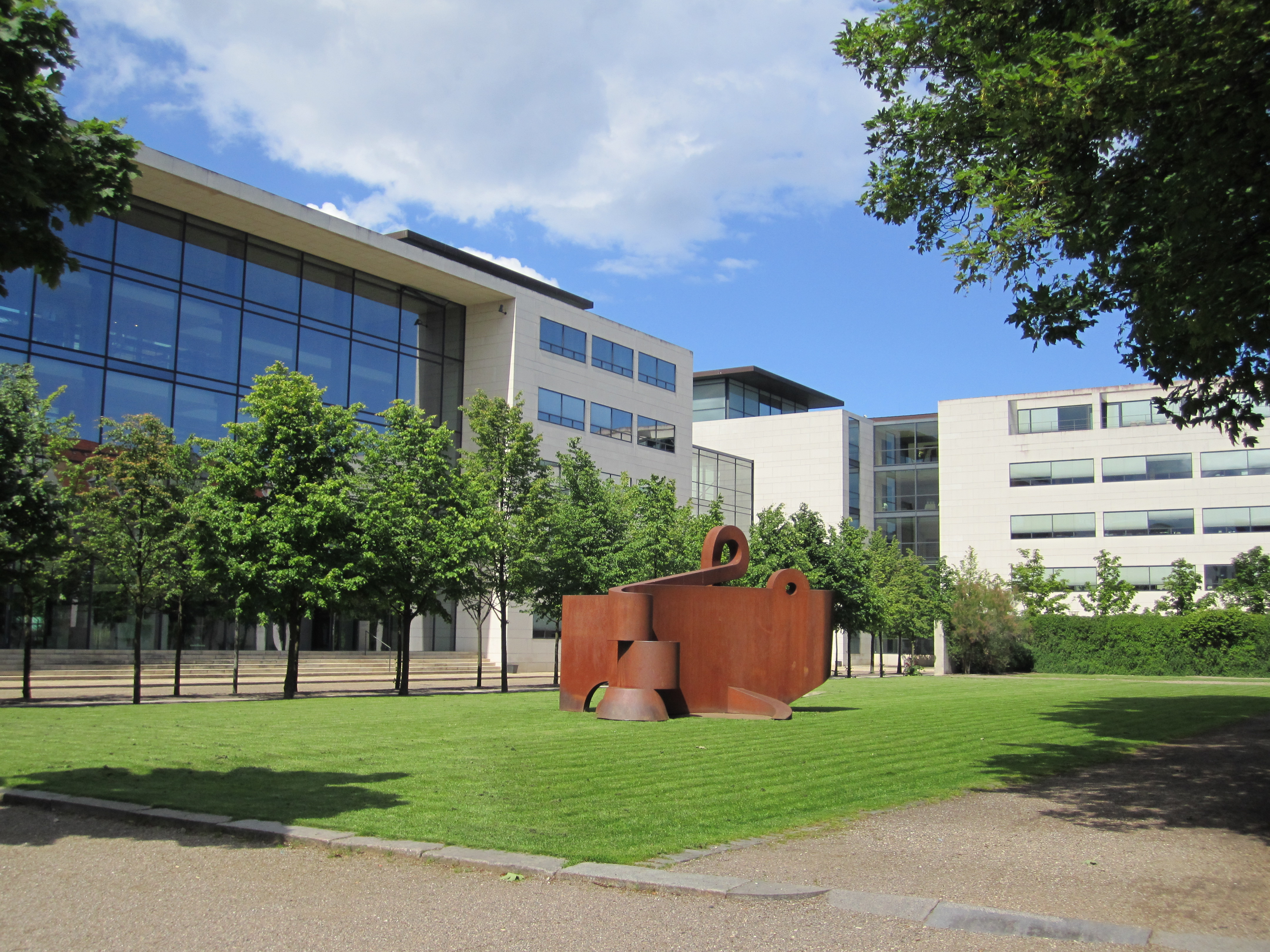
Morten Stræde's sculpture Seasurge at Christianshavn in Copenhagen

Morten Stræde (born 1956) is a Danish sculptor. He attended the Royal Danish Academy of Fine Arts from 1978 to 1985 and later became a professor there (1994–2002). Morten Stræde had his breakthrough in the 1980s; in his art he uses both organic as well as geometric styles. In 2011, he created three new urban spaces in the Nørrebro borough in Copenhagen.

Stræde was awarded the Premio Internazionale di scultura in 1999 and received the Eckersberg Medal in 2000. He has also received the Thorvaldsen Medal. In its appraisal of Stræde's work, the academy noted his ability to assess the history of the place and the physical location where his public art is to be displayed. An example mentioned by the jury is Ulisse which Stræde produced for the University of Aarhus.

== Representation ==
Stræde is represented at the following art museums:

- National Gallery of Denmark
- Kobberstiksamlingen
- ARoS Aarhus Kunstmuseum
- Herning Museum of Art
- Horsens Museum of Art
- Kunstmuseet Køge Skitsesamling
- Vestsjællands Museum of Art
- Kunstmuseet Trapholt
- Esbjerg Art Museum
- Vejle Museum of Art
- Gothenburg Museum of Art
