= Svend Borberg =

Danish author, playwright, editor and literary critic (1888–1947)

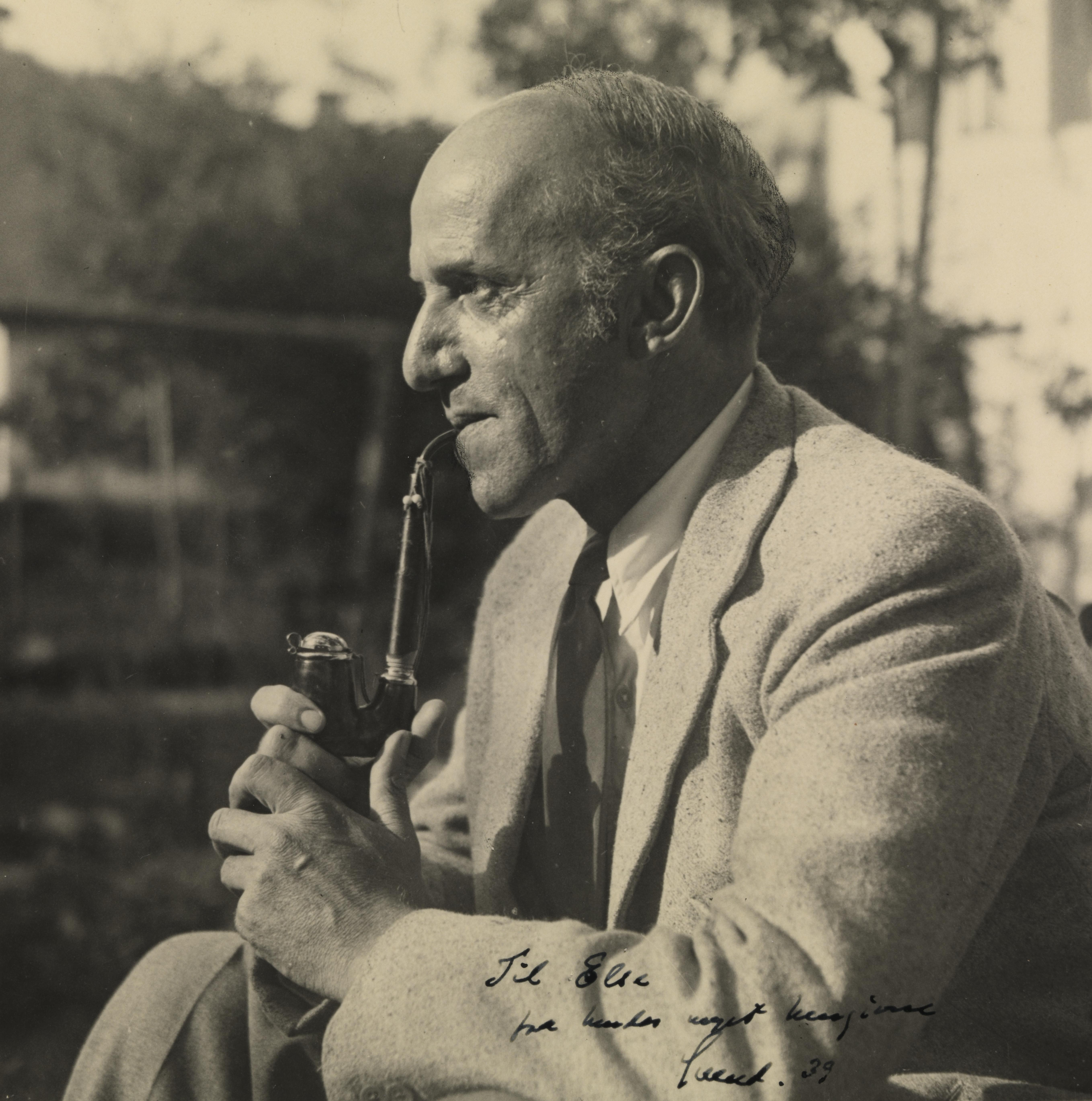
Svend Borberg in 1939

Svend Borberg (April 8, 1888 – October 7, 1947) was a Danish author, playwright, editor and literary critic. He was the brother of N. C. Borberg and William Borberg and the father of Claus von Bülow.

== Biography ==
Borberg was born in 1888 in Copenhagen to Christian Borberg (1835-1896) and his wife, Caroline Amalie Dorothea Ernestine Thea de Hofman-Schmidt (1858-1892). His father was a physician and his mother's family were minor nobility from North Jutland. He graduated from the Metropolitan School in Copenhagen in 1907 and took philosophy the following year. He was made a Knight of the Order of the Dannebrog in 1938. Due to his suspected collaboration with the German authorities during the Occupation of Denmark in World War II, Borberg was expelled from the Danish Dramatists' Guild, the Danish Writers Association and the Kraks Blå Bog.

Svend Borberg's plays are preserved in the Drama Collection of the Royal Library. He died in Copenhagen and is buried at Mariebjerg Cemetery.

== Works ==
- Cirkus juris; or, The Siamese Twins. A Mind Game, 1935.
- Sinner and Saint; Tragedy, 1939. Performed at the Royal Danish Theatre with Thorkild Roose in the role of Don Quixote.

== In literature ==
- Holger Jerrild, "Hos Svend Borberg", s. 216-225 i: Gads Danske Magasin, 1935.
- Ib Boye, Forfængelighedens pris : nærbillede af Svend Borberg, mellemkrigsårenes visionære kritiker, Cicero 1988. ISBN 87-7714-011-7.
