= Claus von Bülow =

British lawyer and socialite (1926–2019)

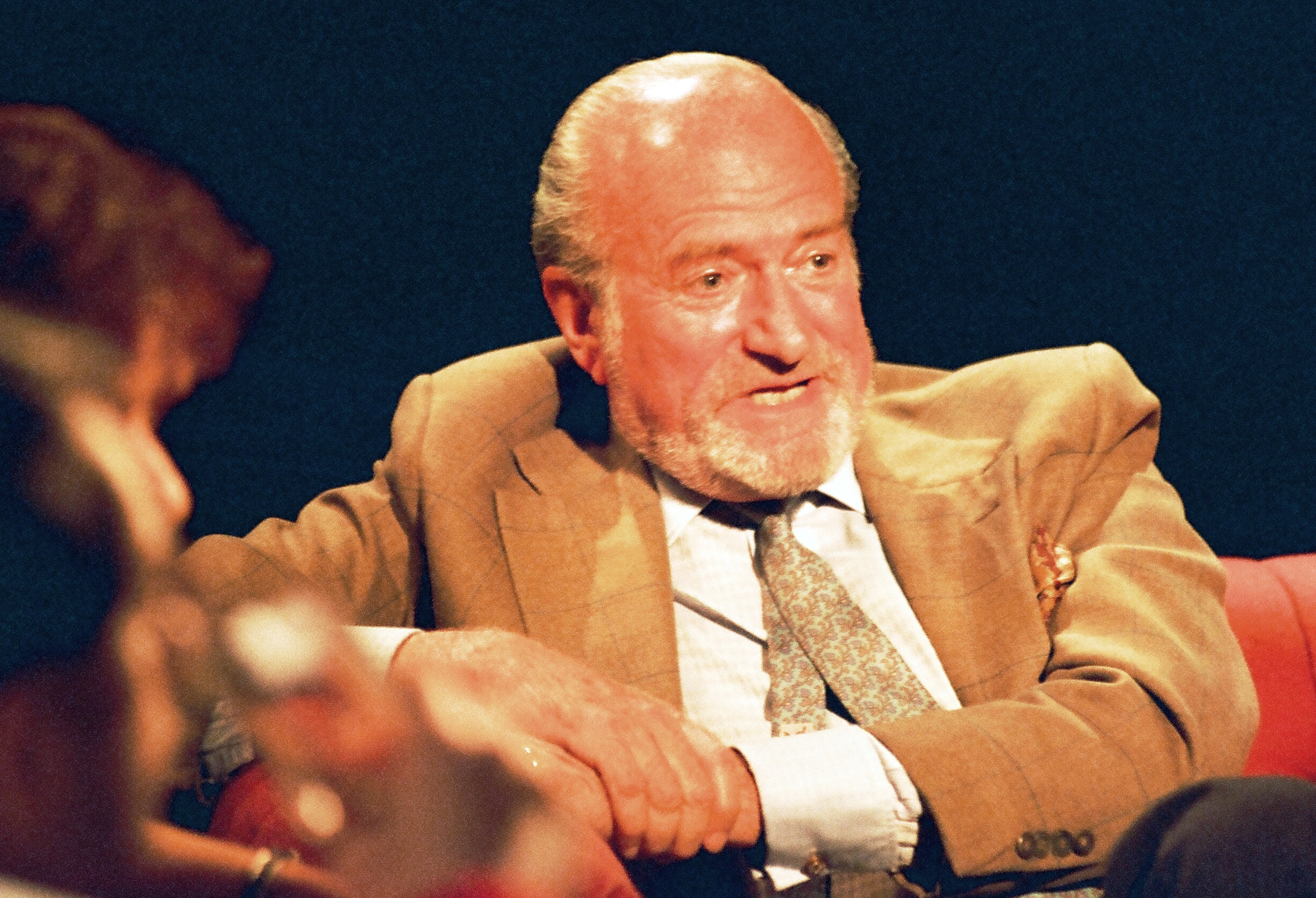
- Appearing on After Dark in 1997
- Born: Claus Cecil Borberg; 11 August 1926; Copenhagen, Denmark
- Died: 25 May 2019 (aged 92); London, England
- Education: Trinity College, Cambridge
- Occupations: Lawyer, consultant, socialite
- Spouse: Martha Sharp "Sunny" Crawford (m. 1966; div. 1987)
- Children: Cosima von Bülow Pavoncelli
- Father: Svend Borberg
- Relatives: Bülow family

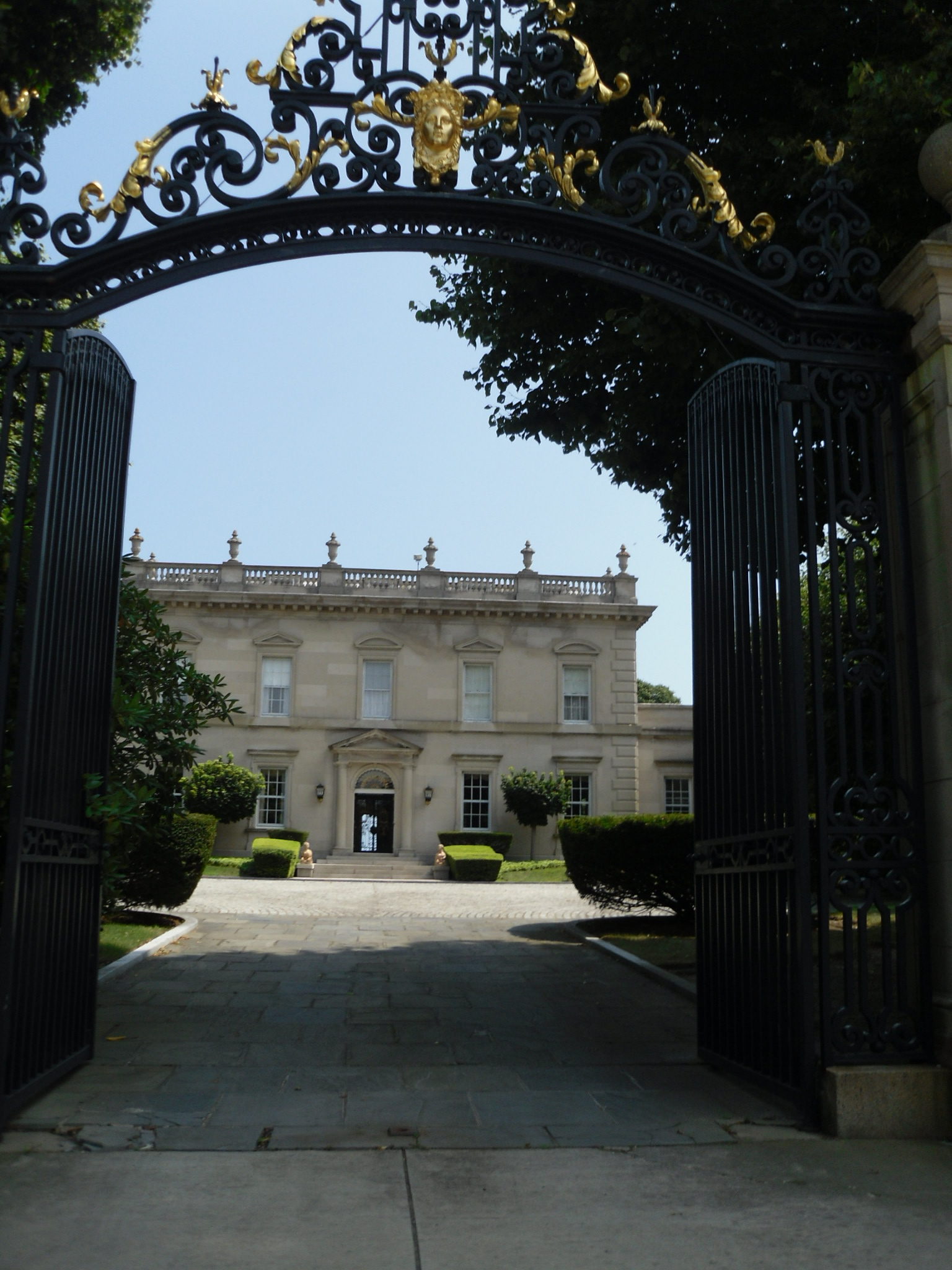
Clarendon Court, Yznaga Street and Bellevue Avenue, Newport, Rhode Island

Claus von Bülow (born Claus Cecil Borberg; 11 August 1926 – 25 May 2019) was a British lawyer, consultant and socialite. In 1982, he was convicted of attempting to murder his wife Sunny von Bülow (born Martha Sharp Crawford; 1932–2008) in 1979, which had left her in a temporary coma, and in 1980, when an alleged insulin overdose left her in a persistent vegetative state for the rest of her life. On appeal, both convictions were reversed, and von Bülow was found not guilty at his second trial.

== Background ==
Beginning life as Claus Cecil Borberg, Bülow was the son of Danish author and playwright Svend Borberg (1888–1947) and his wife, Jonna von Bülow-Plüskow (1900–1959). His father was accused, though later cleared, of being a Nazi collaborator for his activities during the Second World War in the German occupation of Denmark. After graduating from university with a degree in law and becoming an apprentice in the legal profession, Claus chose to be known by his maternal surname, Bülow, instead of his father's surname, Borberg. His mother was the daughter of Frits Bülow von Plüskow, Danish Minister of Justice from 1910 to 1913, president of the upper chamber of the Danish Parliament from 1920 to 1922 and a member of the old Dano-German noble Bülow family, originally from Mecklenburg.

Von Bülow graduated from Trinity College, Cambridge, and practised law in London in the 1950s before working as a personal assistant to J. Paul Getty. While he had a variety of duties for Getty, Bülow became very familiar with the economics of the oil industry. Getty wrote that Bülow showed "remarkable forbearance and good nature" as his occasional whipping boy, and Bülow remained with Getty until 1968.

On 6 June 1966, von Bülow married Sunny, the American ex-wife of Prince Alfred von Auersperg. He worked on and off as a consultant to oil companies. Sunny already had a son and a daughter from her first marriage; together, she and Bülow had a daughter, Cosima von Bülow, born on 15 April 1967 in New York City.

== Attempted murder trials ==
In 1982, von Bülow was arrested and tried for the attempted murders of Sunny on two occasions in two consecutive years. The main medical and scientific evidence against him was that Sunny had low blood sugar, common in many conditions, but a blood test showed a high insulin level. The test was not repeated. A needle was used as evidence against von Bülow in court, with the prosecution alleging that he had used it and a vial of insulin to try to kill his wife. His mistress of two years, the soap opera actress Alexandra Isles, testified "He said that they had been having a long argument, talk, about divorce that had gone on late into the night. She had drunk a great deal of eggnog. And then he said, 'I saw her take the Seconal.' And then he said that the next day when she was unconscious that he watched her knowing that she was in a bad way, all day, and watched her and watched her. And finally, when she was at the point of dying, he said that he couldn't go through with it and he called (the doctor) and saved her life." The discovery of these items became the focal point of von Bülow's appeal.

At the trial in Newport, Rhode Island, von Bülow was found guilty and sentenced to 30 years in prison; he appealed, hiring Harvard Law School professor Alan Dershowitz to represent him. Dershowitz served as a consultant to the defence team led by Thomas Puccio, a former federal prosecutor. Dershowitz's campaign to acquit von Bülow was assisted by Jim Cramer and future New York attorney general and governor Eliot Spitzer, who were then Harvard Law School students. Dershowitz and his team focused on the discovery of the bag containing the syringes and insulin. Sunny's family had hired a private investigator to look into her coma. The private investigator, Edwin Lambert (an associate of the Bülows' lawyer Richard Kuh), was told by several family members and a maid that Claus had recently been seen locking a closet in the Newport home that previously was always kept open. The family hired a locksmith to drive to the mansion, with the intention of picking the closet lock to find what the closet contained. They had lied to the locksmith and told him that one of them owned the house. When the three arrived, the locksmith insisted that they try again to find the key, and after some searching, Kuh found a key in von Bülow's desk that unlocked the closet. At this point, according to the three men in the original interviews, the locksmith was paid for the trip and left before the closet was actually opened, although the men would later recant that version and insist that the locksmith was present when they entered the closet. It was in the closet that the main evidence against von Bülow was found. In 1984, the two convictions from the first trial were reversed by the Rhode Island Supreme Court. In 1985, after a second trial, von Bülow was found not guilty on all charges.

At the second trial, the defence called eight medical experts, all university professors, who testified that Sunny's two comas had not been caused by insulin, but by a combination of ingested (not injected) drugs, alcohol, and chronic health conditions. The experts were John Caronna (chairman of neurology, Cornell); Leo Dal Cortivo (former president, U.S. Toxicology Association); Ralph DeFronzo (medicine, Yale University); Kurt Dubowski (forensic pathology, University of Oklahoma); Daniel Foster (medicine, University of Texas Southwestern); Daniel Furst (medicine, University of Iowa); Harold Lebovitz (director of clinical research, State University of New York); Vincent Marks (clinical biochemistry, Surrey, vice-president Royal College of Pathologists and president, Association of Clinical Biochemistry); and Arthur Rubinstein (medicine, University of Chicago).

Cortivo testified that the hypodermic needle tainted with insulin on the outside (but not inside) would have been dipped in insulin but not injected; injecting it through flesh would have wiped it clean. Evidence also showed that Sunny's hospital admission three weeks before her final coma showed she had ingested at least 73 aspirin tablets, a quantity that could only have been self-administered, and which indicated her state of mind.

Dershowitz, in his book Taking the Stand, writes about von Bülow's dinner party after he was found not guilty at his trial. Dershowitz replied to the invitation that he would not attend if it was a "victory party", and von Bülow assured him that it was only a dinner for "several interesting friends". Norman Mailer also attended the dinner where Dershowitz explained why the evidence pointed to von Bülow not having attempted to murder his wife. As Dershowitz recounted, Mailer grabbed the arm of his wife, Norris Church Mailer, and said: "Let's get out of here. I think this guy is innocent. I thought we were going to be having dinner with a man who actually tried to kill his wife. This is boring."

After his acquittal, von Bülow made his home in London while making occasional appearances at Broadway opening nights and other Manhattan social events for the rest of his life.

== Death ==
Von Bülow died on 25 May 2019 at his home in London, England.

== In popular culture ==
- The 1990 film Reversal of Fortune depicts the case and its surrounding fallout. For his portrayal of Claus von Bülow, Jeremy Irons won the Academy Award for Best Actor.
- Klaus and Sunny Baudelaire from A Series of Unfortunate Events are named after Claus and Sunny von Bülow.
