= Vejle Museum of Art =

Museum in Vejle, Jutland, Denmark

Coordinates: 55°43′N 9°32′E

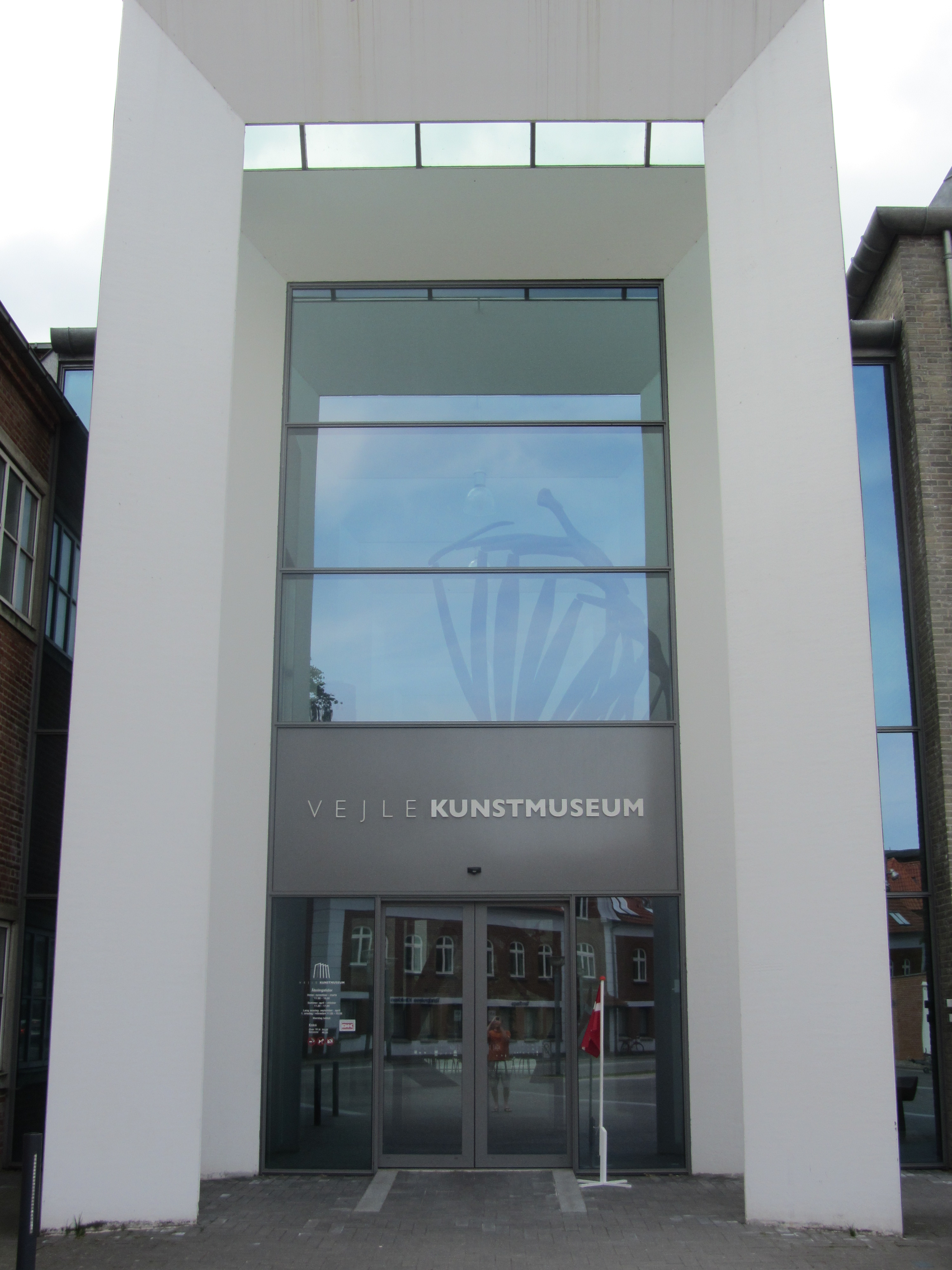
Vejle Museum of Art

Vejle Museum of Art (Danish: Vejle Kunstmuseum) in the town centre of Vejle in southeastern Jutland, Denmark has Danish paintings and sculptures from classic modernism up until pre-COBRA on display. The museum is also home to a collection of Golden Age paintings from the Vejle area as well as a collection of drawings, e.g. 50 etchings by Rembrandt.

== Collection ==
The museum was founded in 1899 when councillor Christian Eckardt donated approx. 2000 drawings. The present collection counts more than 15,000 works on paper including art by Albrecht Dürer, Andrea Mantegna and Rembrandt as well as Danish artists. The collection was substantially enhanced when in 1995 a butcher and his wife donated their collection of early COBRA works to the museum.

Among the modern Danish highlights of the museum are works by Asger Jorn, Else Alfelt, Carl-Henning Pedersen, Ejler Bille, Richard Mortensen, Robert Jacobsen and Henry Heerup.

The museum re-opened in 2006 after building new exhibition spaces with a presentation of works by Merete Barker, Jes Fomsgaard, Nina Sten Knudsen, Preben Fjederholt, Anders Moseholm, Doris Bloom, Hans Christian Rylander, Peter Brandes and Morten Stræde.

The re-opening coincided with the 400th anniversary for Rembrandt's birth for which reason the museum showcased the drawings from the Dutch master.

== The building ==
The museum is housed in a complex consisting of the former museum from 1923 and library from 1934 in Vejle to which a new building by Kim Utzon was added in 2006. The three different types of buildings offer different types of exhibition spaces; the 1923 building has small, intimate rooms where drawings, graphic art, and paintings of an older date can be seen. The 1934 building has larger rooms where pre-COBRA works from the 1930s and 1940s are displayed. The Utzon building has a large room with a skylight fit for contemporary art. It also has a storage area as well as a study gallery.

== Opening times ==
Located at Flegborg 16-18, Vejle, the museum is open to visitors free of charge from 11 am to 4 pm. Closed from 22 to 26 December, 31 December, and 1 January.
