= Ville Jais Nielsen =

Danish painter and sculptor (1886–1949)

- Born: Vilhelmine Jais Oppenheim; 5 May 1886; Randers, Denmark
- Died: 7 November 1949 (aged 63); Gentofte, Denmark
- Known for: Painting
- Movement: American modernism
- Spouse: Jais Nielsen

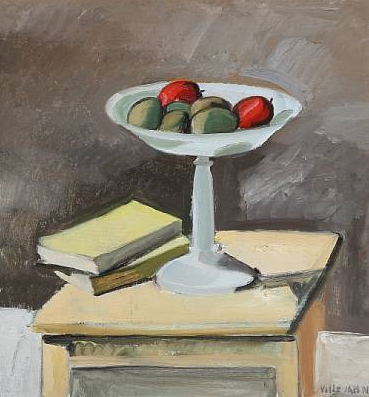
Nature morte

Vilhelmine "Ville" Jais Nielsen (née Oppenheim; 1 May 1886 – 7 November 1949) was a Danish painter and sculptor. She is remembered for the many portraits of women she painted while in Sweden during the Second World War, marked by strong brushstrokes and sensitive lighting effects. Her husband was the artist Jais Nielsen.

== Early life and family ==
She was born in Randers, the daughter of the merchant Carl Oppenheim and Jeanette Cohn. Her training included the Art School for Women (1905–07); work for Mogens Ballin; an apprenticeship with the silversmith Georg Jensen (1909); and porcelain painting at Bing & Grøndahl (1910–12). She was a student of Othon Friesz in Paris (1912), Harald Giersing in Copenhagen (1913), and Henrik Sørensen in Oslo (1914).

She was the sister of architect Albert Oppenheim, the wife of the painter and ceramist Jais Nielsen, and the mother of the architect Henrik Jais-Nielsen.

== Career ==
Like most of her contemporaries, her early work was in the Fauvism and Cubism styles, with strongly contrasting colours, often influenced by Harald Giersing's use of black. Her later work, especially her portraits, was much lighter.

As a Jew, she had to leave Denmark for Sweden in the Second World War where she painted a large number of interiors and portraits of women (1943–1945), with marked sensitivity to the effects of lighting. She also painted landscapes, including some of Bornholm, the strong brushstrokes giving them an ornamental effect. In 1949, she and her husband spent some time in Vence in the south of France where she painted some of her finest works. After returning to Denmark, she died a few months later in Gentofte when she was only 63.

== Exhibitions ==
She first exhibited at the 1916 Autumn Exhibition at Charlottenborg. She also exhibited in other exhibitions in Denmark, often together with her husband, as well as in Stockholm and Gothenburg. In 1949, she organized a large retrospective of her works at Den Frie Udstilling which received enthusiastic support from the press.

== Awards ==
In 1945, she was awarded the Thorvald Bindesbøll Medal and, in 1947, the Eckersberg Medal for a portrait of her 25-year-old daughter, Lise.
