= Jais Nielsen =

Danish painter, designer and ceramist

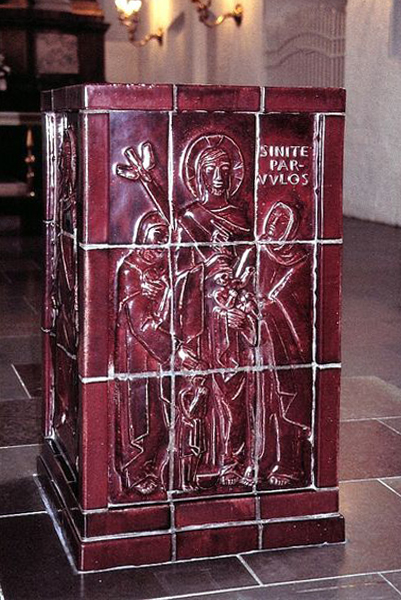
Ceramic baptismal font by Jais Neilsen in Randers Sankt Mortens Church.

Johannes Knud Ove Jais-Nielsen (23 April 1885 – 8 November 1961) was a Danish painter, designer and ceramist, best known for the religious figure groups that he designed for the Royal Copenhagen pottery.

== Biography ==
Nielsen was born in Copenhagen, Denmark, and was married to artist Ville Jais Nielsen (née Oppenheim). He died at Gentofte Hospital in Hellerup, Denmark and is buried at Mariebjerg Cemetery.

== Artistic career ==
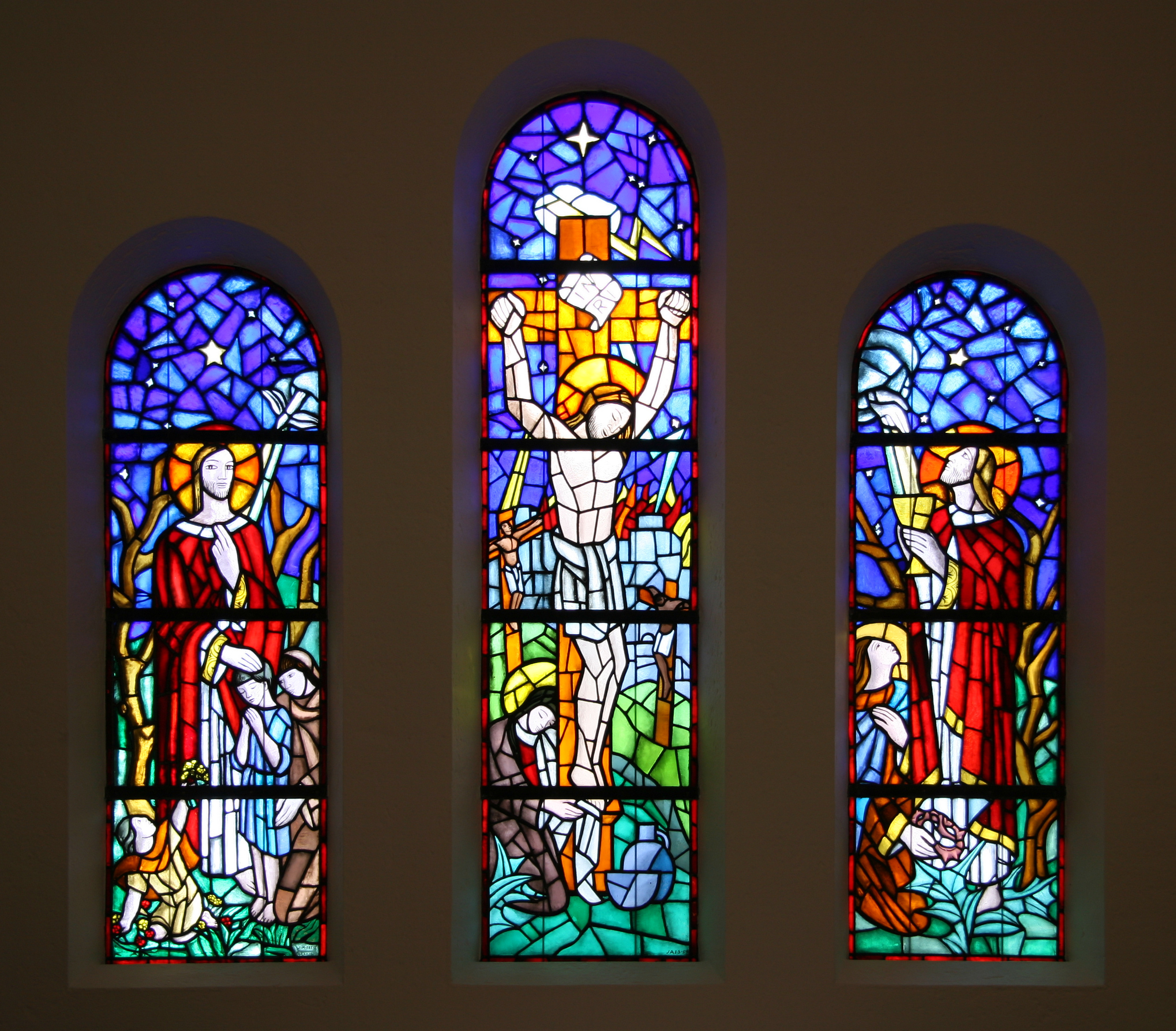
Stained glass windows by Jais Nielsen in the Flintholm Church, Copenhagen.

Nielsen studied painting at the Kunstnernes Frie Studieskoler under Kristian Zahrtmann and Johan Rohde, but abandoned the academic style under the influence of modern art that he saw on his study trips. Nielsen made several excursions to important art centres, travelling to Berlin (1909) and Paris (1911–1914). In 1920 he travelled to Italy, where he took a particular interest in the Renaissance art.

Nielsen's art was influenced by the Cubism that he encountered in Paris. His paintings developed angular lines and fragmentation which, as in his early masterpiece Afgang (Departure), show a tendency towards Futurism. His paintings are predominantly of figures in motion and represent a wide range of subjects, including the circus, a subject which had inspired many avant-garde painters, including Degas, Toulouse-Lautrec and Picasso. His work Circus Performance. Acrobats (1916) depicts trapeze artists soaring weightlessly through the air. His trip to Italy in 1920 was the inspiration for monumental works such as Brylluppet i Kana (Marriage at Cana). He also painted landscapes on Bornholm in a style resembling that of the other Bornholm painters.

From 1915 Nielsen created sculptures in the Cubist style. From 1921 to 1928 he was employed as a sculptor by the Royal Copenhagen porcelain factory, for whom he produced a series of ceramic sculptures on Biblical subjects which included the Good Samaritan and several versions of Jacob wrestling with the Angel. His sculptures were widely applauded and, for a time, their fame overshadowed that of his paintings.

As well as statuettes, Nielsen produced ceramic wares in a wide range of shapes and monochrome glazes including celadon, ironstone and oxblood glaze. These pots are decorated with figures, mainly in relief but also engraved or painted, generally representing Biblical subjects. According to Ulla Grut "The resulting figures, for example 'The Potter', have a vigour of modelling and monumental effect that overrides the boundary between painting and sculpture."

Jais Nielsen decorated some of the Danish bookbinder August Sandgren's vellum bindings in water colour.

== Exhibitions ==
- In 1909 and 1910 Nielsen joined the group of socially oriented artists known as De Tretten (The Group of Thirteen), exhibiting with them in 1909 and 1910. He later participated in modern art trends in Denmark but did not join the Danish artists' cooperative Grønningen.
- In 1912 he exhibited at Salon d'Automne in Paris.
- In 1960 an exhibition of his ceramics was held at Charlottenborg Palace, Copenhagen.
- In 1986 Nielsen's painting Uscita! was the only work by a Danish artist represented in the Futurismo & Futurismi exhibition in Venice.
- Also in 1986, there was a retrospective exhibition of his works at Galerie 1900-2000 in Paris.
- In 2009, a large exhibition of his works was held at Bornholms Kunstmuseum.
- Museums holding works by Nielsen include the National Art Museum of Denmark, the National Gallery of Norway in Oslo, and the Museum Lolland-Falster, Maribo, Denmark.

== Awards ==
In 1925 Nielsen's work The Potter won the Grand Prix at the Paris Exhibition.

Jais Nielsen was awarded Eckersberg Medal (1929) and the Thorvaldsen Medal (1948).
