= Leo Dal Cortivo =

American Toxicologist

Dr. Leo A. Dal Cortivo (September 16, 1928 – December 15, 2011), a forensic toxicologist was the Chief Toxicologist and Director of Forensic Science Laboratories in Suffolk County, Long Island, New York, from 1960 through 1990.

Dal Cortivo provided expert testimony regarding the "Encrusted Needle" in the Claus von Bulow appeal trail for the accused murder of his wife Sunny von Bulow. Alan Dershowitz referenced Dal Cortivo in his book Reversal of Fortune acknowledging his expert testimony and how it strengthened the defense's case Dal Cortivo was born and raised in New York City. He received a B.S. Degree at Fordham College, a M.S. Degree in biochemistry at Adelphi University and his Doctorate in Toxicology at Fordham. He served in the US Army at the First Army Area Medical Laboratories in New York City. He went on to become the Senior Toxicologist in the Office of Chief Medical Examiner, City of New York, until 1960.

In 1960 he accepted the position of Chief Toxicologist and Director of Forensic Science Laboratories in Suffolk County on Long Island, New York. He appeared as an expert witness in numerous court cases, and was referenced or quoted in many news stories/articles in publications such as CBS Evening News, Long Island New York's Newsday, Time Magazine and The New York Times.

He was a consultant for the Department of Defense and for the Department of Health and Human Services, inspecting drug testing laboratories throughout the country and abroad. Dr. Dal Cortivo was a Fellow of the American Academy of Forensic Sciences (AAFS) and past chairman of its Toxicology Section; a co‐founder of the Society of Forensic Toxicologists (SOFT) and its second President; the Director of the American Board of Forensic Toxicology from 1975-1980; a former Treasurer and Trustee of the Forensic Science Foundation; a member of The International Association of Forensic Toxicologists (TIAFT).

Dal Cortivo authored or co-authored many peer reviewed and utilized scholarly papers. In 1990, the Toxicology Section of the AAFS honored him with the Alexander O. Gettler Award for his contributions to the field of forensic toxicology.
