= Axel Salto =

Danish artist (1889–1961)

Axel Johannes Salto
- Born: 17 November 1889; Copenhagen, Denmark
- Died: 21 March 1961 (aged 71); Frederiksberg, Denmark
- Resting place: Frederiksberg Ældre Kirkegård
- Education: Royal Danish Academy of Fine Arts
- Style: Ceramics
- Awards: Eckersberg Medal; Prince Eugen Medal

Axel Johannes Salto (17 November 1889 – 21 March 1961) was a Danish ceramic artist of international fame. His works also include painting, graphic design and illustrations for books, jewelry and textiles. As author and founder of the art magazine Klingen (1917–1919), Salto was also an important contributor to the art debate in Denmark.

== Biography ==
Axel Johannes Salto was born in Copenhagen, Denmark. He was the son of H.C. Salto, married to Kamma Salto and father of Naja Salto. He graduated from Frederiksberg Latin og Realskole in 1907 and was a student of Holger Grønvold at Det tekniske Selskabs Skole from 1907. Salto then studied at the Royal Danish Academy of Fine Arts from 1909 to 1914 under Peter Rostrup Bøyesen. He made his debut as an artist in 1911. In 1916, Salto visited Paris, where he met Pablo Picasso and Henri Matisse. This meeting became a landmark for Salto's artistic ambitions and his influence on the pioneering ideas of the time.

In 1921, Salto co-founded the artistic group De Fire, consisting of Svend Johansen, Vilhelm Lundstrøm and Karl Larsen. The group spent a large part of the 1920s in Paris, where they lived and worked together. The four artists first exhibited at the turn of the year 1920-21 and continued regularly until 1928. The group profiled itself as modern, young and progressive, and its exhibitions were surrounded by debate and controversy.

== Ceramics ==
His primary career as a ceramist took off at the 1925 Paris Exhibition. Throughout the 1920s, his artistic focus shifted from painting to ceramics and he made about 3,000 different stoneware works from 1923 to 1950. A large part of these were made in the Carl Halier ceramic workshop in Frederiksberg. Among Salto's first works was the polychrome porcelain (Bing & Grøndahl, 1923–25), which was presented in the Danish Pavilion at the Paris World Exhibition in 1925. Then followed stoneware in collaboration with Carl Halier (1929–30) and Saxo ceramics (1931–32). From the mid-1930s he worked mainly with The Royal Porcelain factory in Copenhagen.

Salto developed his ceramic stoneware works throughout his career and experimented with unusually rich glazes and organic shapes. He is mainly known for his three main styles characterized by ornamental simplification; rifled style, based on simple repetitive patterns, buttoned style, inspired by chestnuts and eucalyptus fruit and budding style, a reflection of naturally growing plants. Salto used Chinese and classic glazes such as solfatara and sung, among others. From 1951 to 1959, Salto led the renewal of Sonnes Frize at Thorvaldsens Museum. He was a member of Grønningen 1935–45. He received the Eckersberg Medal in 1938 and Prince Eugen Medal in 1959, and the Grand Prix at the Milan Triennial in 1951.

== Klingen ==
After the trip to Paris in 1916 and the meeting with Pablo Picasso, Salto founded the Danish art magazine Klingen published from 1917 to 1920. Salto was both editor and contributor. Although the magazine was only published for two years, it became important as a forum for modernism art as well as the new ideas of the time, with articles by literary critic Einar Otto Gelsted, author Poul Henningsen and artist Harald Giersing, as well as original artwork by Vilhelm Lundstrøm, Olaf Rude, William Scharff and Axel Salto himself.

== Literature ==
- Salto's Keramik (1930). Text: Axel Salto. Illustrations: Axel Salto. 130 pages. OCLC number: 62351142.
- Salto's Træsnit (1940). Text by Axel Salto and Paul la Cour. Illustrations: Axel Salto. 48 pages. OCLC number: 462552040. Published by A/S Det Hoffenbergske Etablissement.
- Den spirende Stil (1949). Text by Axel Salto. Illustrations: Axel Salto. 130 pages. OCLC number: 62351142. Published by Grafisk Cirkel.
- Axel Salto: Grafiker, keramiker och textilkonstnar (1949). Text by Axel Salto, Björn Lundegård, Pierre Lübecker, Nils Lindhagen, Nils Palmgren. Published by Folkrörelsernas Konstfrämjande, Stockholm.
