= William Scharff =

Danish painter

Niels William Scharff (30 October 1886 – 20 September 1959) was a Danish painter, one of the leading proponents of Cubism in Denmark.

== Early life ==
After training as a painter at Copenhagen's Technical School, Scharff attended Kristian Zahrtmann's art school (1907–1909) where he met young talents including Vilhelm Lundstrøm, Jais Nielsen and Olaf Rude. As a student, he travelled to Berlin, Dresden and Paris.

== Career ==
During the First World War, Scharff was involved in Grønningen, a new artists' cooperative with an interest in Cubism. His Cubist tendencies can clearly be seen in his Legende I (1911, Randers Kunstmuseum) and in a series of pictures depicting poultry (1917–1918) and representing harmony between man and nature. His style was inspired by Cubism and the Abstract art movement while many of his subjects were based on his upbringing with his grandparents in the farming community of Tisvilde in the north of Zealand.

In addition to his paintings, he decorated the students' residence Studentergaarden with Frescofrescoes (1943–1953), designed tapestries for Christiansborg (1951–1958) and created the curtain for Tivoli's concert hall (1956).

== Awards ==
Scharff was awarded the Eckersberg Medal in 1924 and the Thorvaldsen Medal in 1957. He was made a knight of the Order of the Dannebrog in 1943 and Commander in 1954. He died in Copenhagen and was buried at Tibirke cemetery at Tisvilde.

== See also ==
- List of Danish painters
