= Niels Larsen Stevns =

Danish painter and sculptor (1864–1941)

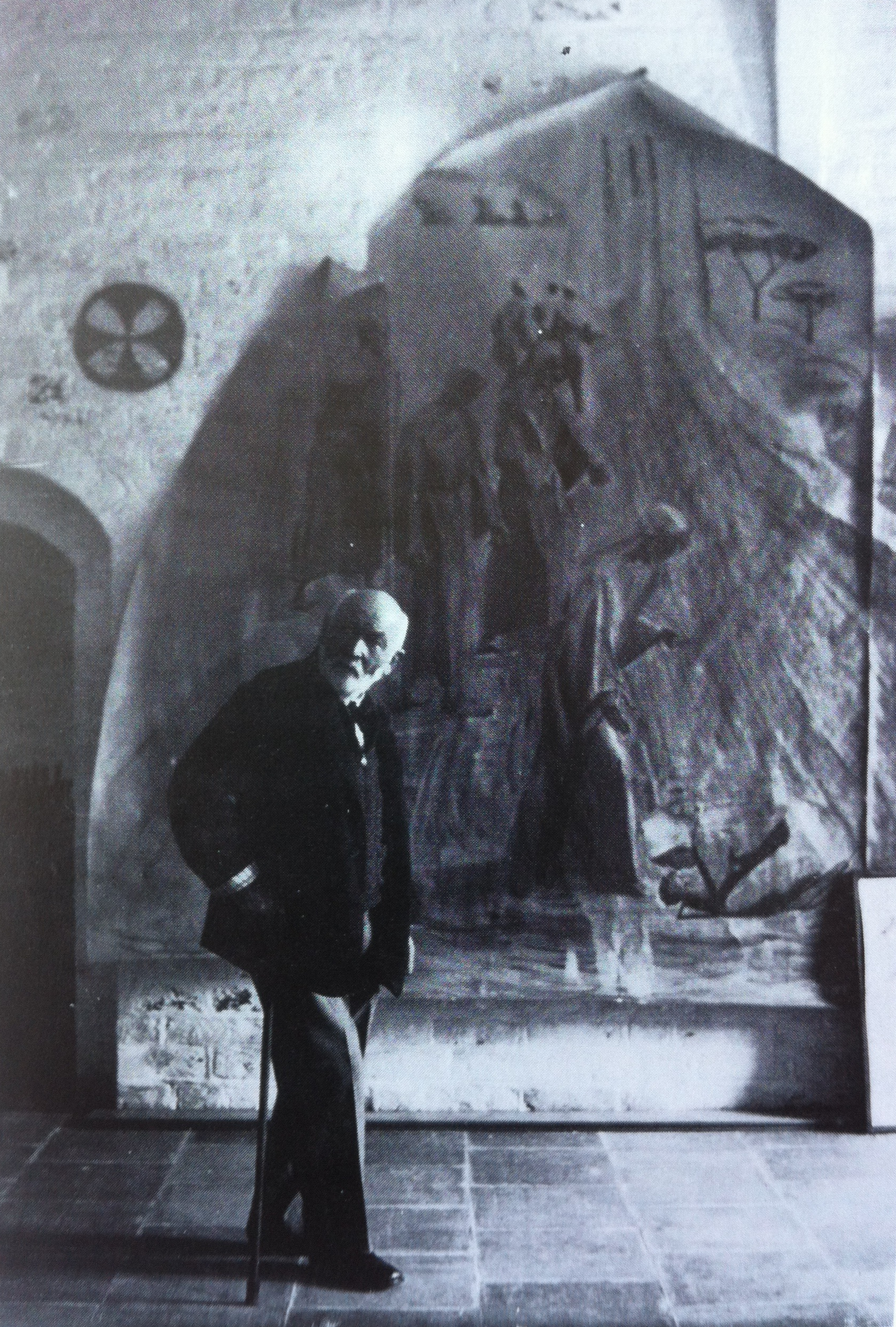
Niels Larsen Stevns in the church of the Holy Spirit in Slagelse. 1938

Niels Larsen Stevns (9 July 1864 – 27 September 1941) was a Danish painter and sculptor. He was originally educated as a journeyman painter but attended Kunstakademiet in the years 1886–1887 and 1892–1894. He assisted Joakim Skovgaard decorating the cathedral in Viborg in a simplified style, based on early Christian and Byzantine art.

== Early years ==
Stevns was born in the village of Gevnø, Zealand, Denmark, where his father was a clog maker and thatcher. It was a very humble and frugal family. Stevns developed at a young age, and maintained throughout his life, a fervent belief in God. Even as a boy, Stevns showed a talent for wood carving. He had the opportunity to develop this during a long illness at the age of twelve. This started his ideas to become an artist, gradually taking shape in the boy's head. At the age of eighteen he took a handicraft course and won a prize in a local competition.

== Artistic education ==
An adherent of N. F. S. Grundtvig, he painted religiously inspired paintings in a modernist style with a universally human message, e.g. Kristus og Zakæus (1913, Randers Museum of Art) and the altarpiece Kristus og Nikodemus (1918) in Vrensted Church south-west of Hjørring.

== Cooperation with Joakim Skovgaard ==
Stevns belonged to the Fynbo School of artists. This generation gained their mainly picturesque ideas in the Zahrtmann school. Then through his longstanding cooperation with Joakim Skovgaard he supported what is known as the “Skovgaard tradition”, receiving a thorough training in monumental painting. He is represented in the collections at Skovgaard Museum, the National Gallery of Denmark, Randers Art Museum, Sorø Art Museum, Fuglsang Art Museum and Museum Jorn among others. In 2009 Vendsyssel Art Museum inaugurated a new extension underground, devoted to exhibiting and researching his works.

== Travel ==
Stevns first left Denmark, briefly, for Sweden in 1895. Then he visited Italy and Germany in 1896; Italy again in 1900 and in 1904. In September 1922, Stevns married and the couple travelled to the South of France, where Stevns painted landscapes in Cagnes-sur-mer. He worked alongside Axel Salto, Karl Larsen, Svend Johansen and Vilhelm Lundstrom. Stevns was fascinated by the strong southern light, which he perceived as God's very presence in the world. He and his wife then travelled to Florence, staying in the “Villa Linda.” During the time he also travelled to Austria and Germany. These journeys lasted for eleven months, heralding a new phase of his career. A bolder colour vision and a free monumentality marked this period.

In 1928, through an expatriate Dane, Stevns received an order for an altarpiece in a parish in Cascallares, Argentina. Although he did not himself travel there, he finally realised the dream of his youth, in painting such historical pictures. This commission was for a Danish youth school and the subject was Absalon, based on an earlier work in the Cistercian Sorø Abbey, in central Zealand. Stevns’ last recorded journey was to Sweden again, in 1934.

Stevns was awarded the Thorvaldsen Medal in 1933.
