= Funen's Art Museum =

Art museum in Odense, Denmark

Coordinates: 55°23′52″N 10°23′08″E

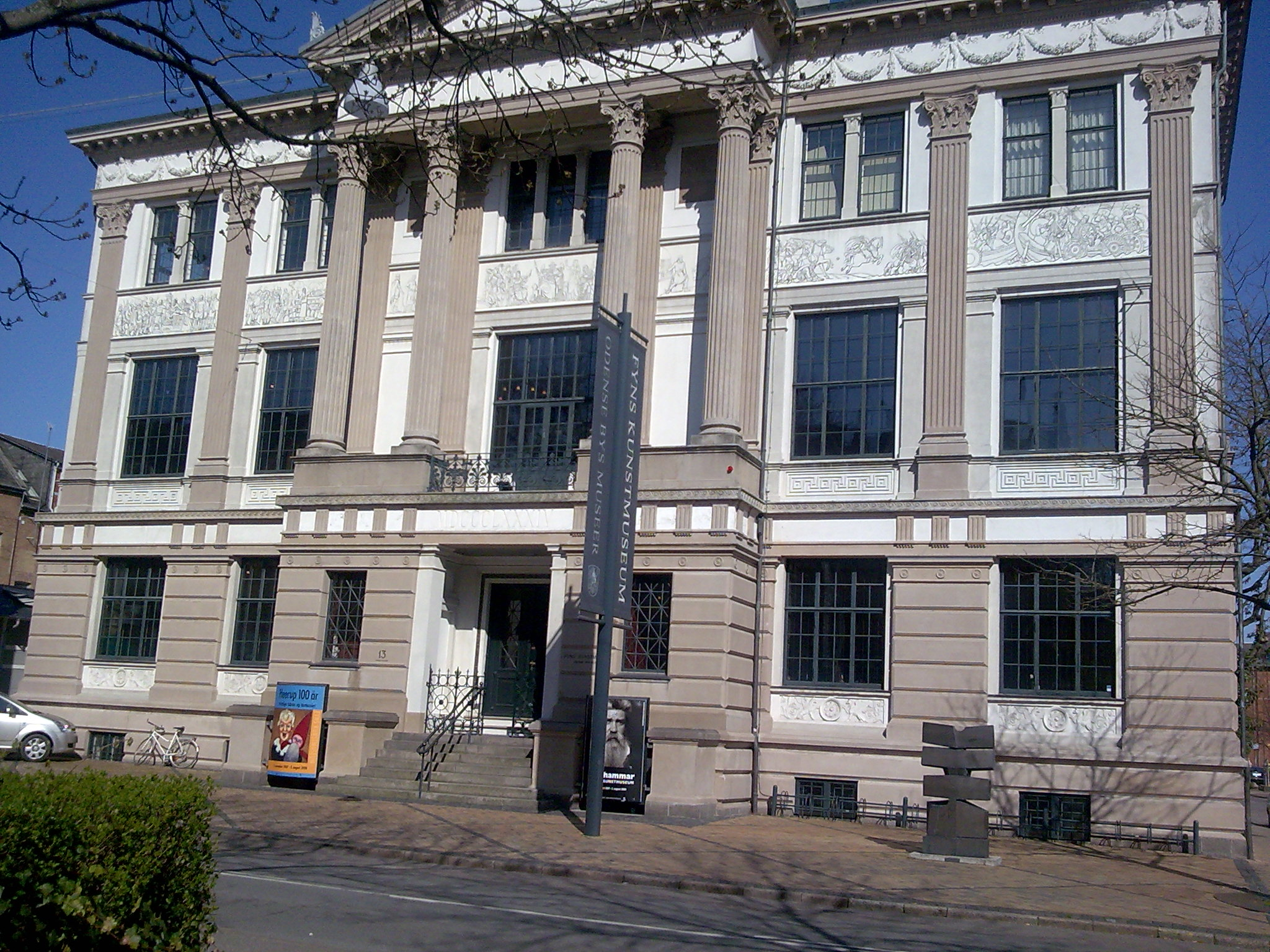
Funen's Art Museum

Funen's Art Museum (Danish: Fyns Kunstmuseum), formerly The Museum of Funen Diocese and Museum Civitatis Othiniensis, founded in 1885, is an art museum in Odense, Denmark. Funen's Art Museum operated as a part of the Odense City Museums (Odense Bys Museer).

== History ==
Fyns Kunstmuseum is housed in a stately neo-classical building built in 1883–84 with Emil Schwanenflügel (1847-1921) as supervising architect. The building has a characteristic temple gable and a decorated frieze with scenes from Denmark's history and Norse mythology.

The museum was founded as a mini version of Nationalgalleriets (later the Statens Museum for Kunst) and holds a wide range of works by important Danish artists. The older section contains amongst other things principal works by Jens Juel, Dankvart Dreyer, P.S. Krøyer and H. A. Brendekilde. There are also works by Harald Giersing, Vilhelm Lundstrøm, Olaf Rude and Vilhelm Bjerke Petersen. The museum specializes particularly in concrete and Constructivist art.
