= Erik Hoppe =

Danish painter

Erik Hoppe (1896–1968) was a Danish painter who is remembered for his paintings from the Copenhagen area, especially those with young ladies in the park at Valby.

Hoppe also mastered the effects of light and colour. His earlier work is typified by greens and dull shades but later he produced compositions benefitting from bright sunlight. His style reflects the peculiarly Danish form of modernism, initially based on the sombre everyday-realism of around 1930. Affinities with the work of Edvard Weie and Harald Giersing can also be detected as his style developed to a lighter, less constrained approach. This tendency was soon to lead to the Grønningen movement which brought together painters of nature and everyday life.

Erik Hoppe is now recognised as one of the more important recent Danish landscape painters whose work can be compared not only to Weie and Giersing but also to Asger Jorn and Per Kirkeby.

== See also ==
- Art of Denmark
