= Danish art =

Danish art is the visual arts produced in Denmark or by Danish artists. It goes back thousands of years with significant artifacts from the 2nd millennium BC, such as the Trundholm sun chariot. For many early periods, it is usually considered as part of the wider Nordic art of Scandinavia. Art from what is today Denmark forms part of the art of the Nordic Bronze Age, and then Norse and Viking art. Danish medieval painting is almost entirely known from church frescos such as those from the 16th-century artist known as the Elmelunde Master.

The Reformation greatly disrupted Danish artistic traditions, and left the existing body of painters and sculptors without large markets. The requirements of the court and aristocracy were mainly for portraits, usually by imported artists, and it was not until the 18th century that large numbers of Danes were trained in contemporary styles. For an extended period of time thereafter art in Denmark either was imported from Germany and the Netherlands or Danish artists studied abroad and produced work that was seldom inspired by Denmark itself. From the late 18th century on, the situation changed radically. Beginning with the Danish Golden Age, a distinct tradition of Danish art began and has continued to flourish until today. Due to generous art subsidies, contemporary Danish art has a big production per capita.

Though usually not especially a major centre for art production or exporter of art, Denmark has been relatively successful in keeping its art; in particular, the relatively mild nature of the Danish Reformation, and the lack of subsequent extensive rebuilding and redecoration of churches, has meant that with other Scandinavian countries, Denmark has unusually rich survivals of medieval church paintings and fittings. One period when Nordic art exerted a strong influence over the rest of northern Europe was in Viking art, and there are many survivals, both in stone monuments left untouched around the countryside, and objects excavated in modern times.

== Nordic Bronze Age ==
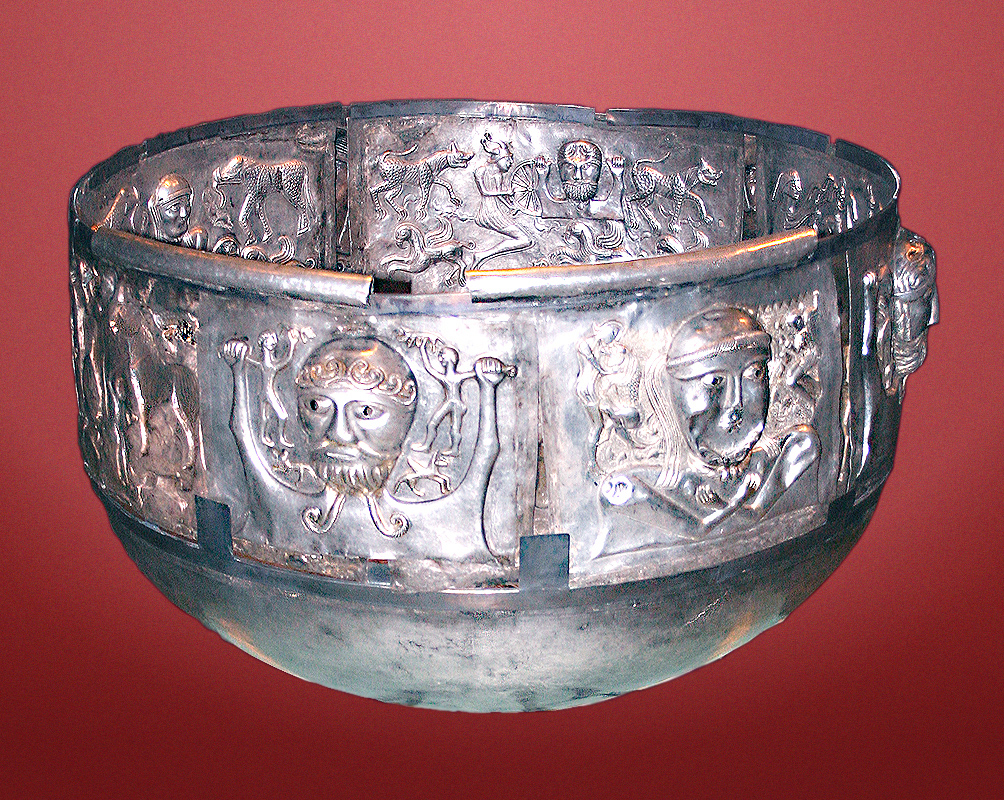
The Gundestrup cauldron

Lurs are a distinctive type of giant curving Bronze Age horn, of which 35 of the 53 known examples have been found in bogs in Denmark, very often in pairs. They are normally made of bronze, and often decorated.

A possibly alien find in Denmark is the Gundestrup cauldron, a richly decorated silver vessel, thought to date to the 1st century BC. It was found in 1891 in a peat bog near the hamlet of Gundestrup in north-eastern Jutland. The silversmithing of the plates is very skilled. Now in the National Museum of Denmark, it is the largest known example of European silver work from the period. The style and workmanship suggest Thracian origin, while the imagery seems Celtic, so it may not reflect local styles.

== Norse art ==
The Germanic Iron Age period of about 400-800 AD is represented by the Golden Horns of Gallehus, now known only from drawings since they were stolen and melted down in 1802, and significant deposits from weapons sacrifice such as that at Illerup Ådal, where 15,000 items were found, deposited during the period 200–500.

Danish sites have given their names to two of the six main styles of Viking or Norse art, Jelling style (10th century) and its successor Mammen style (10-11th centuries), though the other styles are also represented in Denmark. Only one Danish ship burial is known, from Ladbyskibet. The images on the runestones at Jelling are probably the best known Danish works of the period. Although little of their original paint remains today, copies of the largest stone in the National Museum of Denmark and in the museum at Jelling have been redecorated in vivid colours based on the fragments of paint which remained on the original.

== Medieval church frescos ==
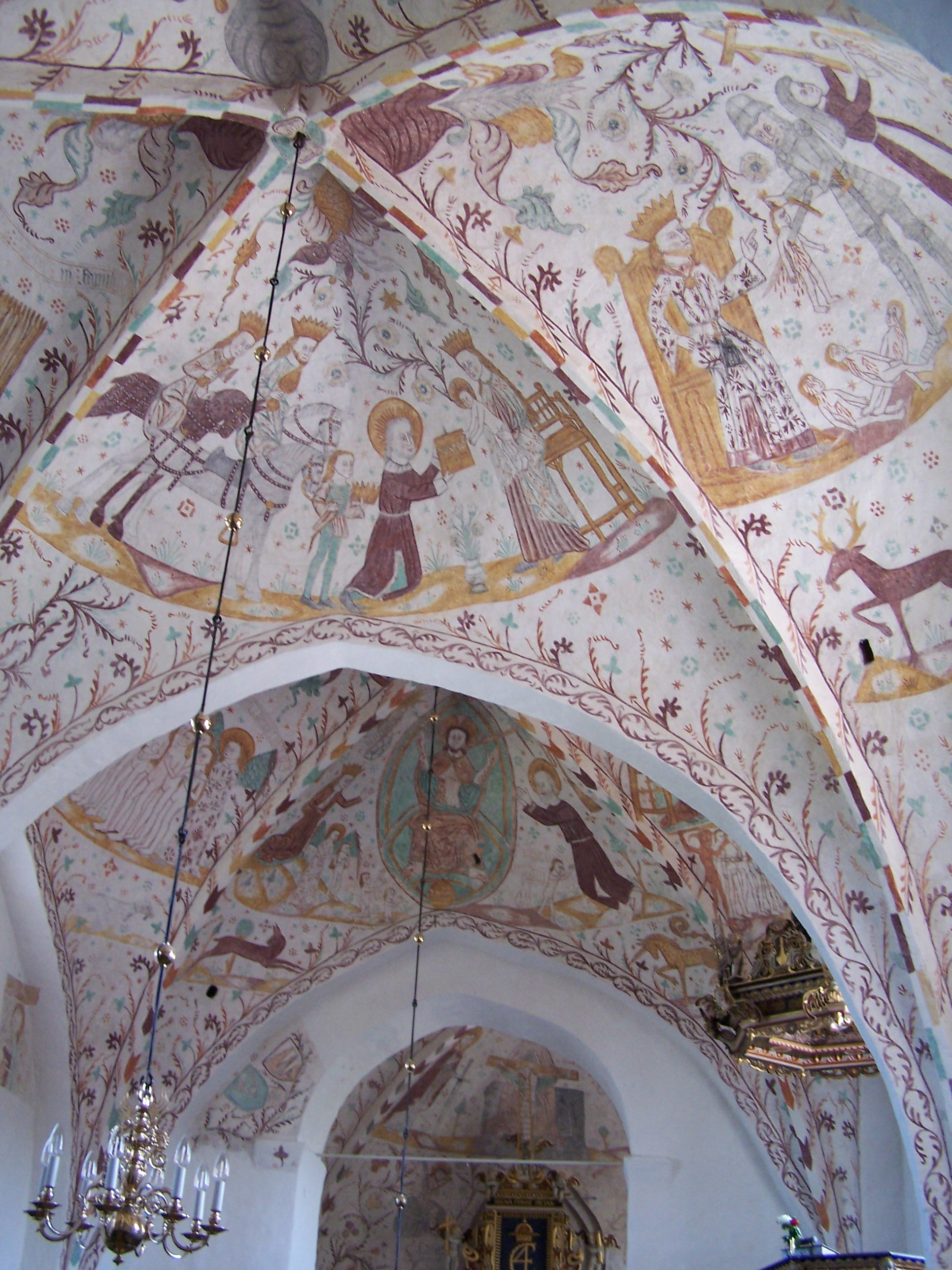
Gothic frescos in Elmelunde Church

Church wall paintings (Danish: kalkmalerier) are to be found in some 600 churches across Denmark, probably representing the highest concentration of surviving church murals anywhere in the world. Most of them date back to the Middle Ages. They lay hidden for centuries as after the Reformation in Denmark, they were covered with limewash (Danish: kalk) only to be revealed and restored during the course of the 19th and 20th centuries. Of most interest to Danish art are the Gothic paintings from the 15th and 16th centuries as they were painted in a style typical of native Danish painters. Adopting the Biblia pauperum approach, they present many of the most popular stories from the Old and New Testaments in typological juxtapositions.

== Renaissance to the 18th century ==
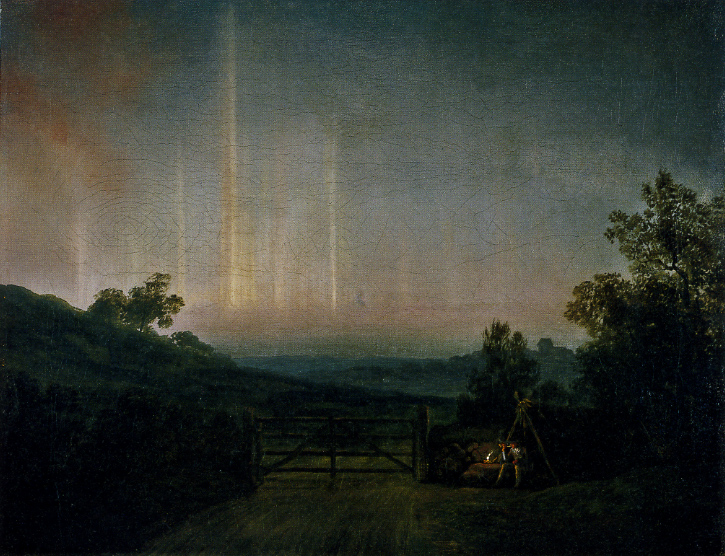
Landscape with Northern Lights - Attempt to Paint the Aurora Borealis, 1790s, by Jens Juel.

Danish panel painting and painted wood-carving of the late Middle Ages was mostly by, or heavily influenced by, the prevailing North German styles, especially those of Hamburg and other Hanseatic cities. At the Protestant Reformation religious painting virtually ceased, and for a long period the most notable portraits of the royal family were made by foreign artists, such as Hans Holbein the Younger's portrait of Christina of Denmark. Albrecht Dürer's portrait of her father Christian II of Denmark, painted in Brussels in 1521, has not survived, though portraits of him by other foreign artists have.

The establishment of the Royal Danish Academy of Fine Arts in 1754 followed the general European pattern, and was intended to develop a national school and reduce the need to import artists from other countries. After a period of development its pupils were indeed to lead the creation of a distinct Danish style. After an architect, the third and fifth Director was Johannes Wiedewelt (1772–1777) and from (1780-1789), a Neoclassical sculptor trained in Italy and France, who had followed his father as court sculptor, and is remembered for his memorials and garden decorations including the monument of King Frederick V in Roskilde Cathedral and the Naval Monument in Holmens Cemetery. The first painter to lead it was the Swedish-born Carl Gustaf Pilo (c. 1711 – 1793), a portraitist and history painter in the grand style, and the next Nikolaj Abraham Abildgaard (1743–1809), himself an ex-student, who developed a Neo-Classical style. Leading Danish artists teaching at the Academy included Christian August Lorentzen and Jens Juel, also later Director. Unlike in England, for example, most leading Danish artists for at least the next century trained at the Academy and often returned to teach there, and the tension between academic art and other styles is much less a feature of Danish art history than that of France, England or other countries.

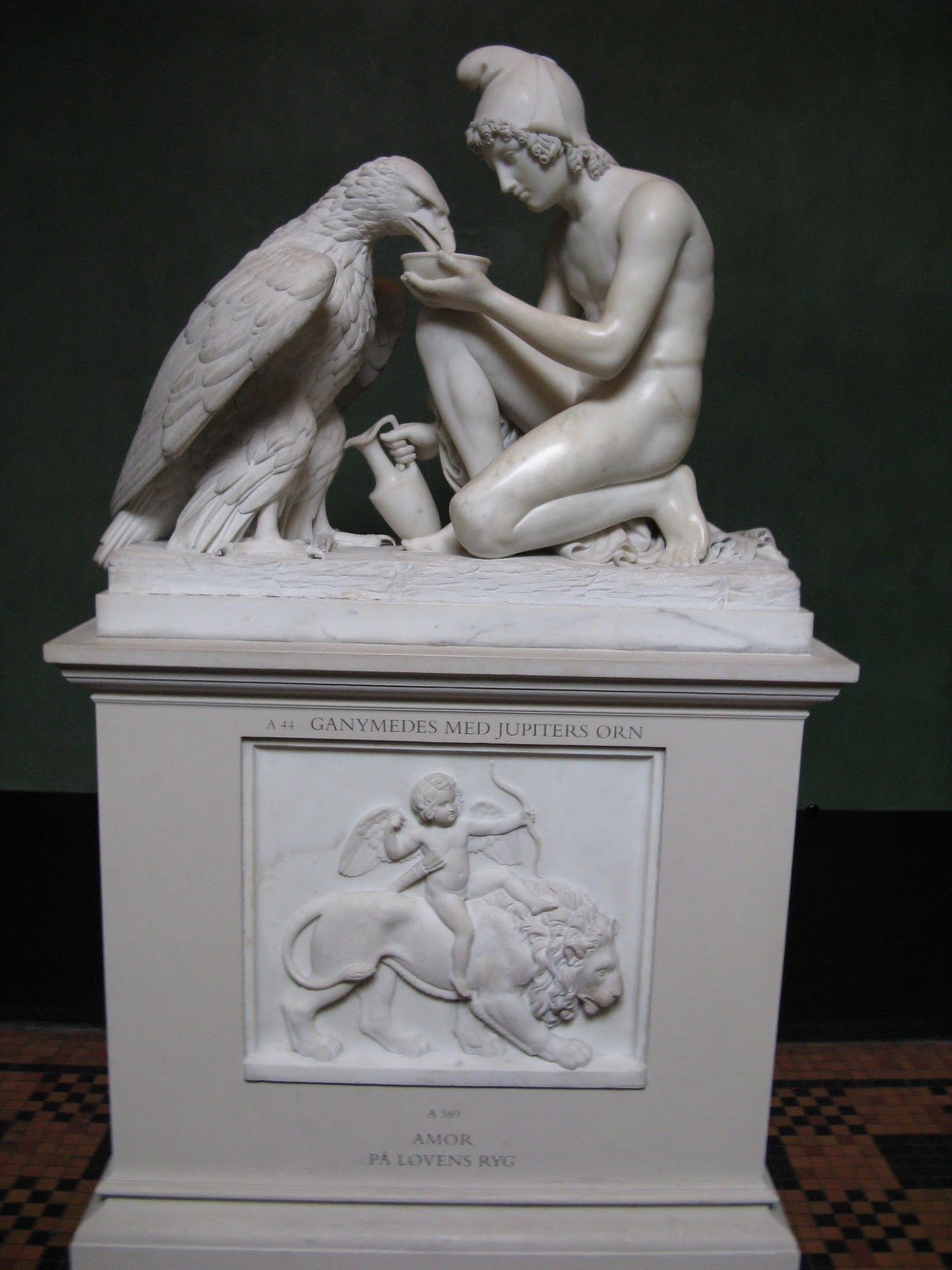
Ganymede and the Eagle by Bertel Thorvaldsen, 1817

A student of Abildgaard's period at the Academy was Bertel Thorvaldsen (1770–1844), by far the most famous Danish sculptor, who along with the Italian Canova was recognised across Europe as the leading Neoclassical sculptor. Among his works are the colossal series of statues of Christ and the twelve Apostles for the rebuilding of Vor Frue Kirke in Copenhagen. Motifs for his works (reliefs, statues, and busts) were drawn mostly from Greek mythology, but he also created portraits of important personalities, as in his tomb monument for Pope Pius VII in St Peter's Basilica, Rome. His works can be seen in many European countries, but there is a very large collection at the Thorvaldsen Museum in Copenhagen. He was based in Rome for many years, and played an important role in encouraging young Danish artists spending time in the city. Another important Neoclassicist produced by the Academy was the painter Asmus Jacob Carstens, whose later career was all spent in Italy or Germany.

The establishment in 1775 of the Royal Copenhagen Porcelain Factory was another royal initiative, typical of monarchies in the period, though the business has outlasted the great majority of such factories, and survives today as part of a larger group, which also includes the Kosta Glasbruk glass company, founded in 1742 by two army officers, and the Orrefors Glasbruk (founded 1898), all known internationally.

== The Golden Age ==
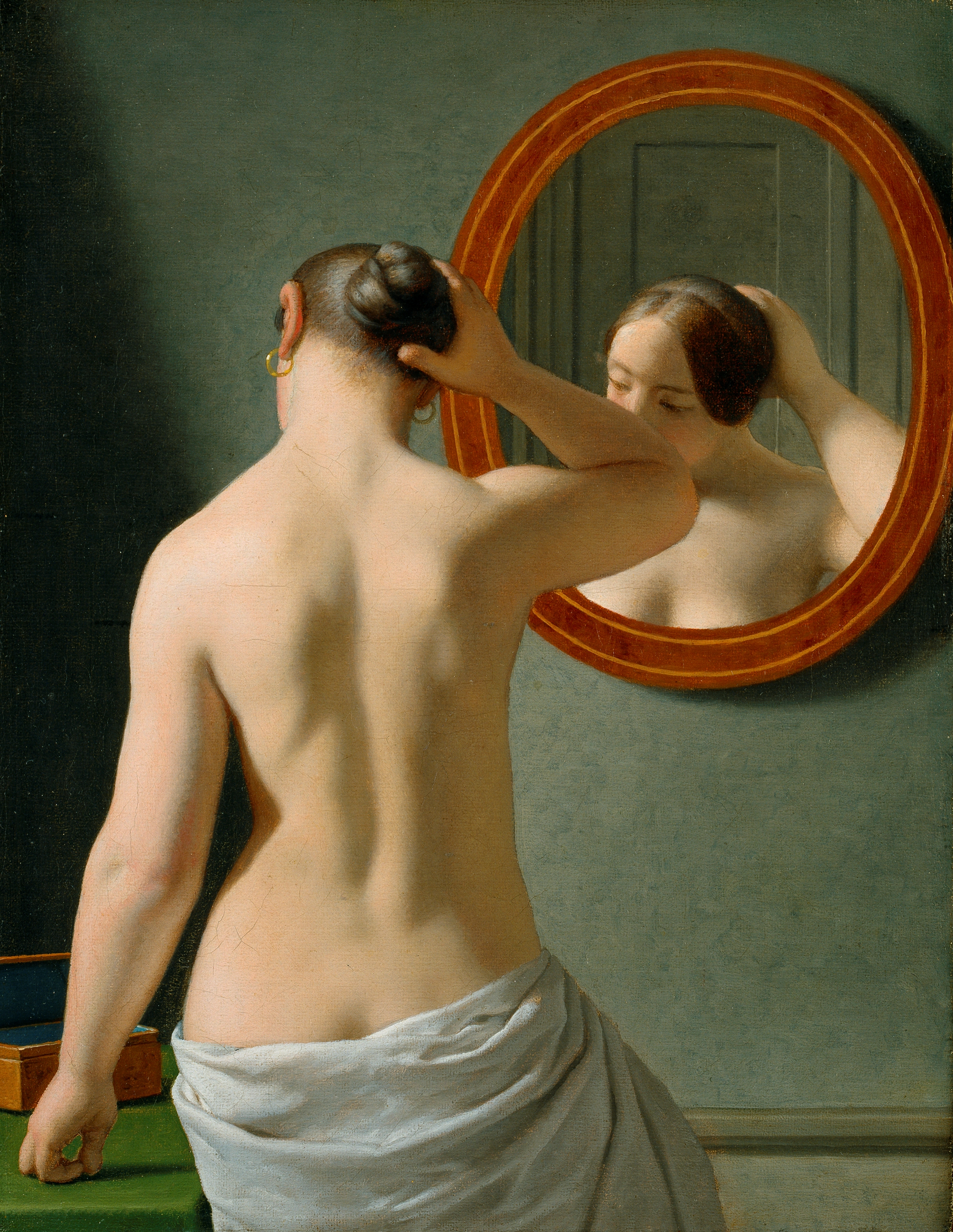
Christoffer Wilhelm Eckersberg, Woman in front of a Mirror, 1841. French Neo-Classicism transmuted into Biedermeier style.

Around the beginning of the 19th century the Golden Age of Danish Painting emerged to form a distinct national style for the first time since the Middle Ages; the period lasted until the middle of the 19th century. It has a style drawing on Dutch Golden Age painting, especially its landscape painting, and depicting northern light that is soft but allows strong contrasts of colour. The treatment of scenes is typically an idealized version of reality, but unpretentiously so, appearing more realist than is actually the case. Interior scenes, often small portrait groups, are also common, with a similar treatment of humble domestic objects and furniture, often of the artist's circle of friends. Little Danish art was seen outside the country (indeed it mostly remains there to this day) and the Danish-trained leader of German Romantic painting Caspar David Friedrich was important in spreading its influence in Germany.

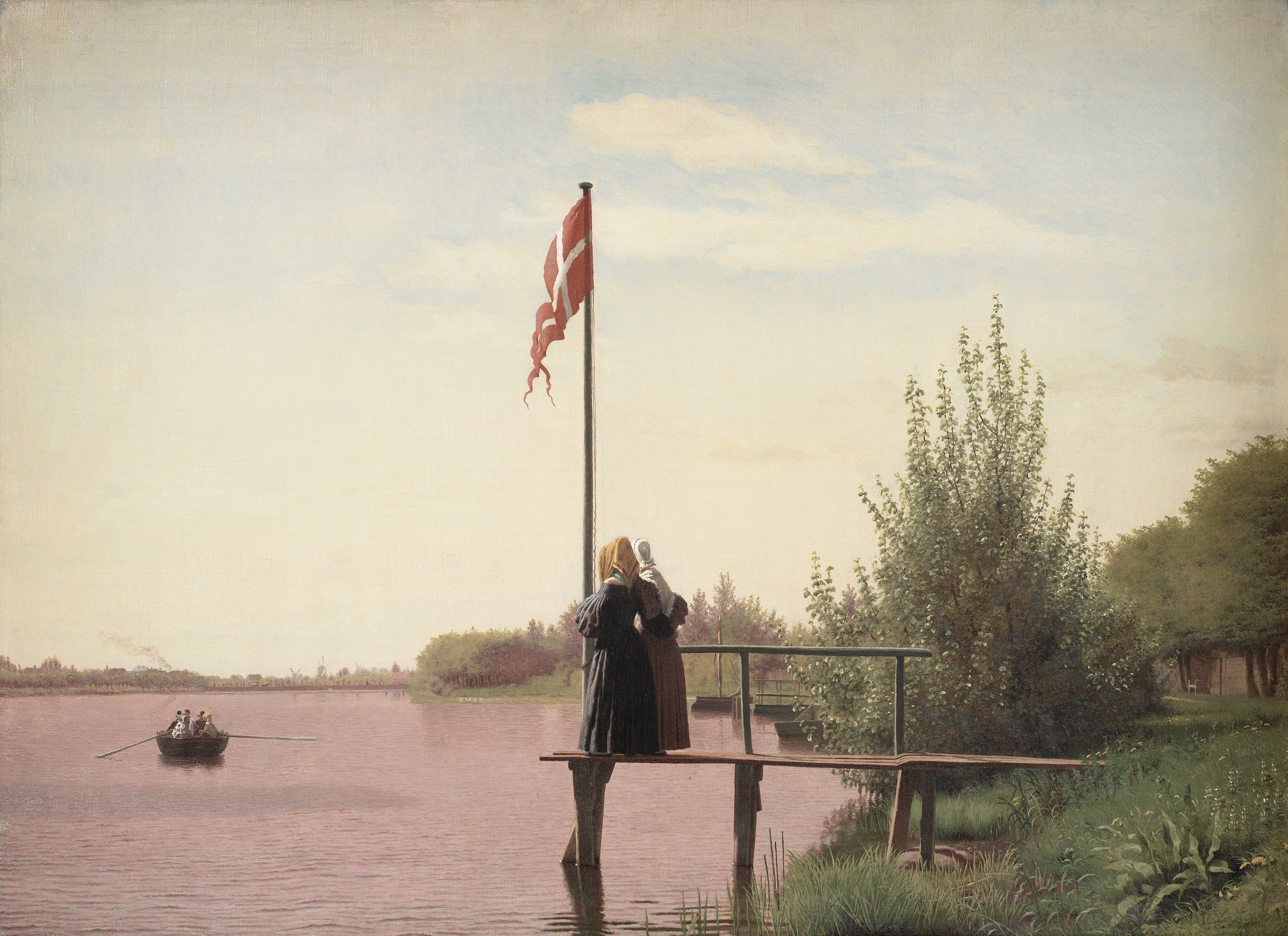
Christen Købke, View of Lake Sortedam, 1838. The Danish flag is frequently seen in paintings of this period.

A crucial figure was Christoffer Wilhelm Eckersberg, who had studied in Paris with Jacques-Louis David and was further influenced towards Neo-Classicism by Thorwaldsen. Eckersberg taught at the Academy from 1818 to 1853, becoming director from 1827 to 1828, and was an important influence on the following generation, in which landscape painting came to the fore. He taught most of the leading artists of the period, including:

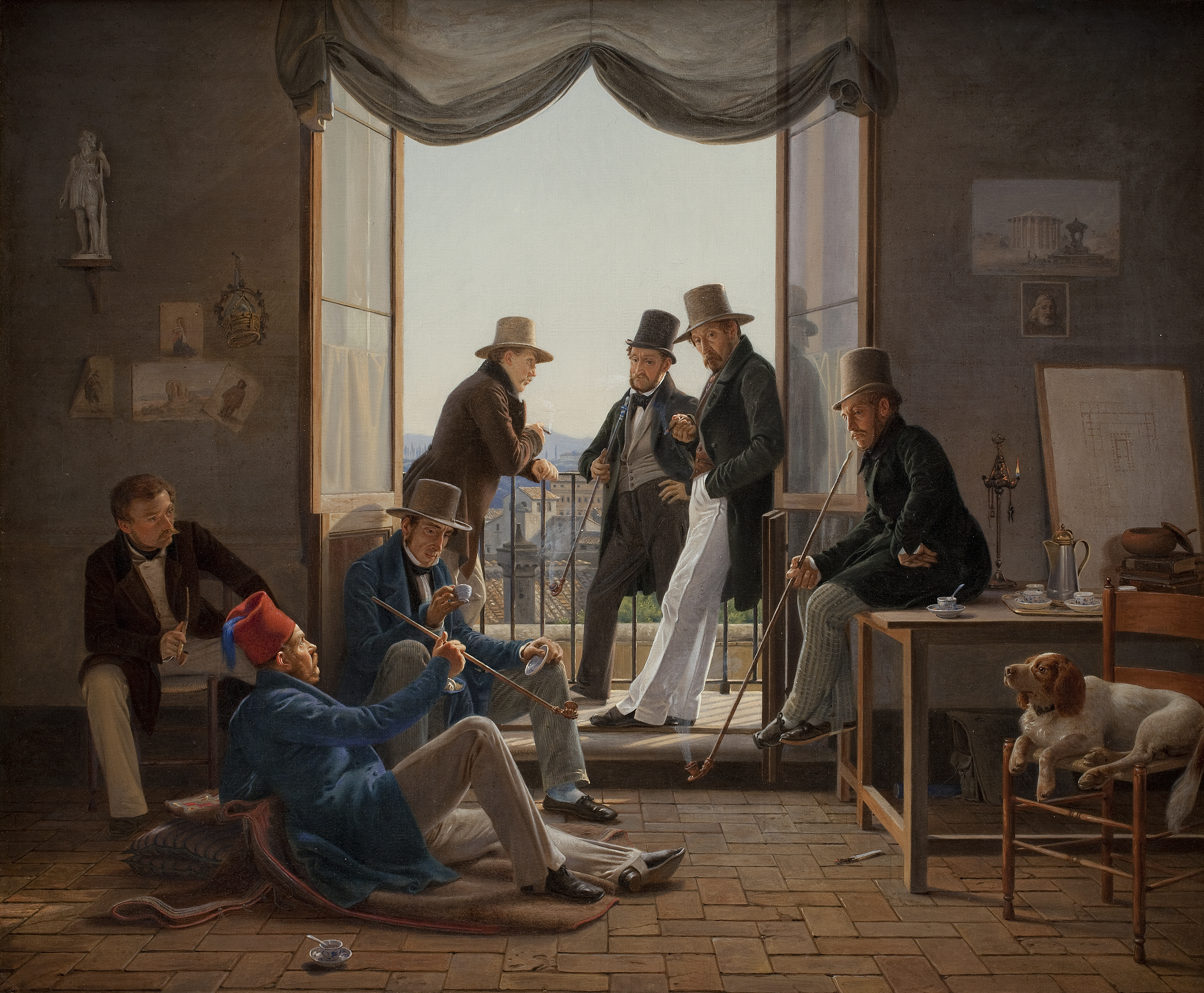
A company of Danish artists in Rome, painted by Constantin Hansen, 1837. Lying on the floor is architect Bindesbøll. From left to right: Constantin Hansen, Martinus Rørbye, Wilhelm Marstrand, Albert Küchler, Ditlev Blunck and Jørgen Sonne.

- Wilhelm Bendz (1804–1832), remembered for his many technically accomplished portraits of fellow artists such as Ditlev Blunck and Christen Christensen, a scene from the Academy's anatomy class, as well as the group portraits "A Tobacco Party" and "Artist in the Evening at Finck's Coffee House in Munich";
- Constantin Hansen (1804–1880), deeply interested in literature and mythology, and inspired by Niels Laurits Høyen, he developed national historical painting based on Norse mythology and painted many portraits, including the historical The Constitutional Assembly (Den grundlovgivende Rigsforsamling);
- Christen Købke (1810–1848), influenced by Niels Laurits Høyen, an art historian who promoted a nationalistic approach calling for artists to search for subject matter in the folk life of their country instead of searching for themes in other countries such as Italy;
- Wilhelm Marstrand (1810–1873), a vastly productive artist who mastered a remarkable variety of genres, remembered especially for a number of his works which have become familiar signposts of Danish history and culture: scenes from the drawing-rooms and streets of Copenhagen during his younger days; the festivity and public life captured in Rome; the many representative portraits of citizens and innovators; even the monumentalist commissions for universities and the monarchy;
- Martinus Rørbye (1803–1848), remembered for his genre paintings of Copenhagen, for his landscapes and for his architectural paintings, as well as for the many sketches he made during his travels to countries rarely explored at the time.

Among other artists, C.A. Jensen (1792–1870) specialized almost exclusively in portraits.

At the end of the period painting style, especially in landscape art, became caught up in the political issue of the Schleswig-Holstein Question, a vital matter for Danes, but notoriously impenetrable for most others in Europe.

== Later 19th century ==
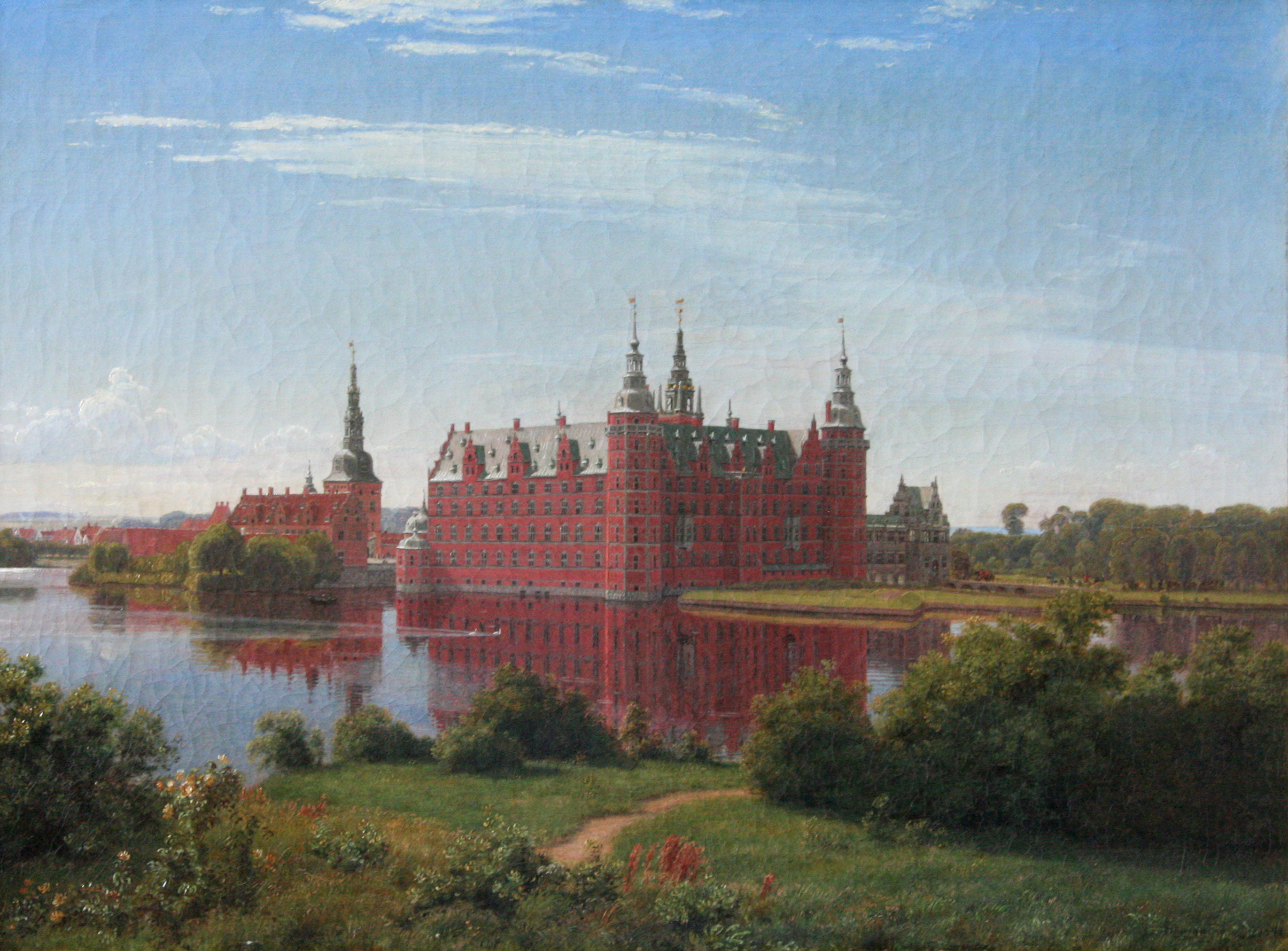
P.C. Skovgaard: Frederiksborg Palace

Danish painting continued many of the characteristics of the Golden Age, but gradually moved closer to styles of the rest of Europe, especially Germany. Artists include:

- Jørgen Roed (1808–1888), who painted many portraits as well as a number of altarpieces and religious paintings, including Jesu Korsfæstelse (Crucifixion of Jesus) for the restored church at Frederiksborg Palace;

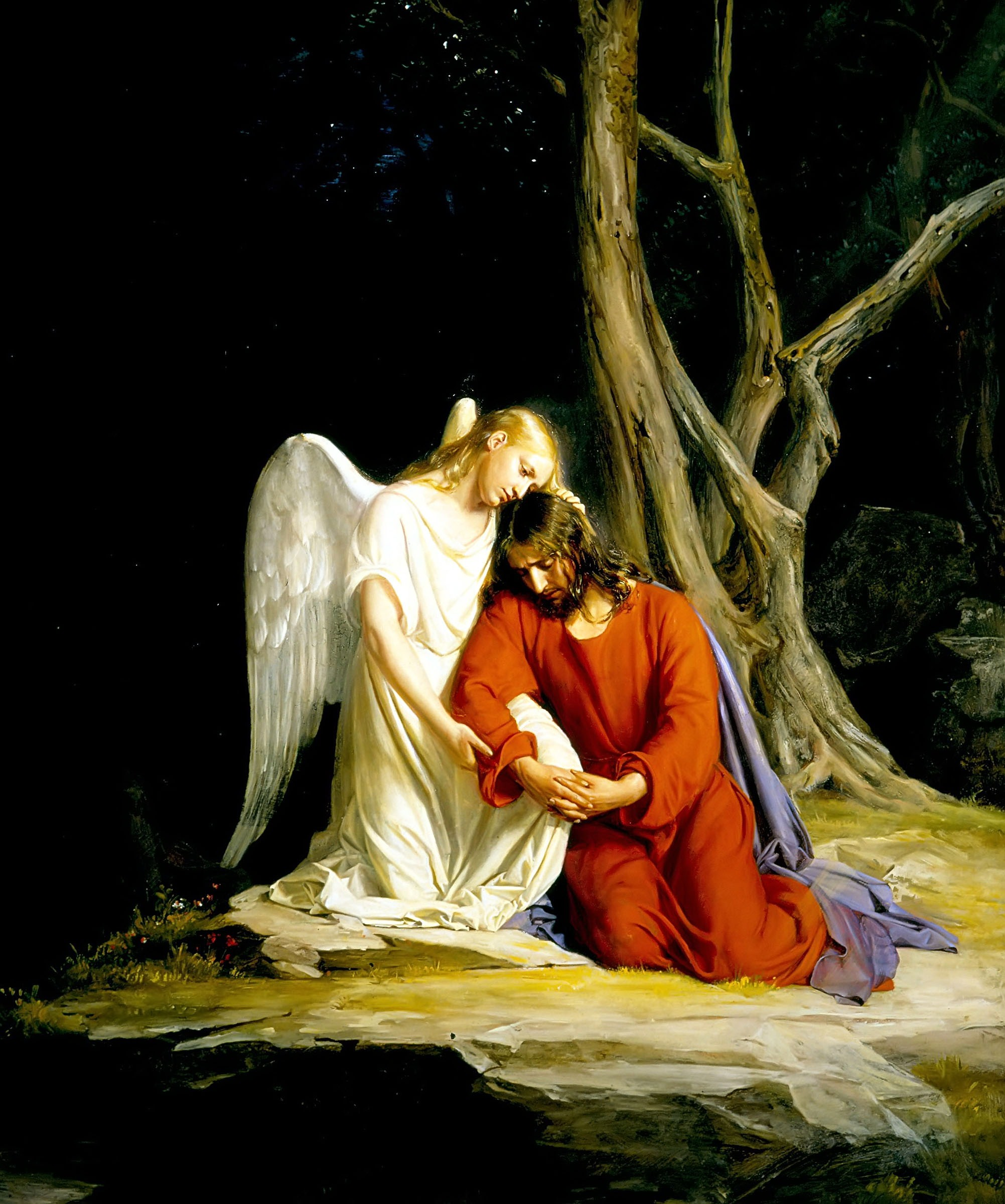
Carl Bloch, Gethsemane

- Johan Lundbye (1818–1848), remembered for his animal paintings and landscapes, especially those of Sealand including the large Kystparti ved Isefjord (Coast View by Isefjord);
- P.C. Skovgaard (1817–1875), primarily known for his landscape paintings, for the special role he played in portraying Denmark's nature, helping to develop a unique Danish art form, and his growing interest in portraying atmosphere and light.

Elisabeth Jerichau-Baumann (1819–1881) was born in Żoliborz (Jolibord) a borough of Warsaw but moved to Denmark when she married Danish sculptor Jens Adolf Jerichau in 1846. She is best known for her portraits and was commissioned by the Danish Royal Family to paint their portraits to the annoyance and jealousy of local artists. The mild eroticism of a few of her paintings was looked upon unfavourably by many at the time but she remained aloof, perhaps reassured by the fact that some of her husband's sculptures were erotic in nature.

Carl Heinrich Bloch (1834–1890) was a rare Danish history painter, mostly of Biblical subjects, who developed his academic style in Italy before returning to Copenhagen in 1866. He was commissioned to produce 23 paintings for the Chapel at Frederiksborg Palace consisting of scenes from the life of Christ which have become very popular as illustrations. For over 40 years the Church of Jesus Christ of Latter-day Saints has made much use of Carl Bloch's paintings, especially those from the Frederiksborg Palace collection, in its church buildings and printed media.

Edvard Eriksen (1876–1959) is best known as the sculptor of the bronze Little Mermaid statue in Copenhagen. Based on the story by Hans Christian Andersen, he completed the work in 1913.

== The Skagen and Funen movements ==
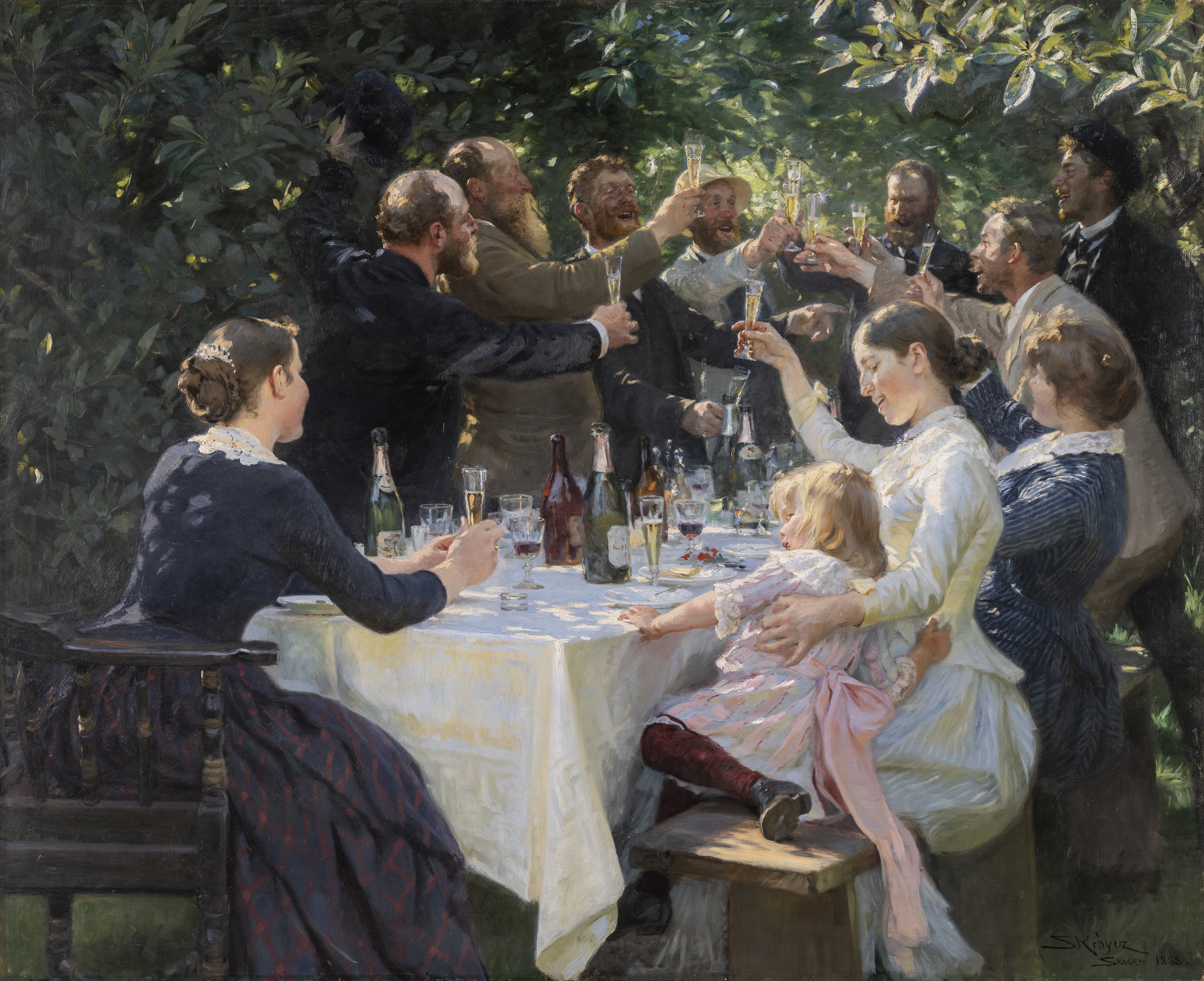
Hip, Hip, Hurrah! by P.S. Krøyer, 1888

In 1871, Holger Drachmann (1846–1908) and Karl Madsen (1855–1938) visited Skagen in the far north of Jutland where they quickly built up one of Scandinavia's most successful artists' colonies. They were soon joined by P.S. Krøyer (1851–1909), Carl Locher (1851–1915), Laurits Tuxen (1853–1927), the Norwegian Christian Skredsvig (1854–1924) and Michael (1849–1927) and Anna Ancher (1859–1935). All participated in painting the natural surroundings and local people. The symbolist Jens Ferdinand Willumsen (1863–1958) also visited the Skagen community.

A little later, at the very beginning of the 20th century, a similar phenomenon developed on the island of Funen with the encouragement of Johannes Larsen (1867–1961) and the inspiration of Theodor Philipsen. Fynboerne or the Funen Painters included: Peter Hansen, Fritz Syberg, Jens Birkholm, Karl Schou, Harald Giersing, Anna Syberg, Christine Swane and Alhed Larsen.

== Modernism and expressionism ==
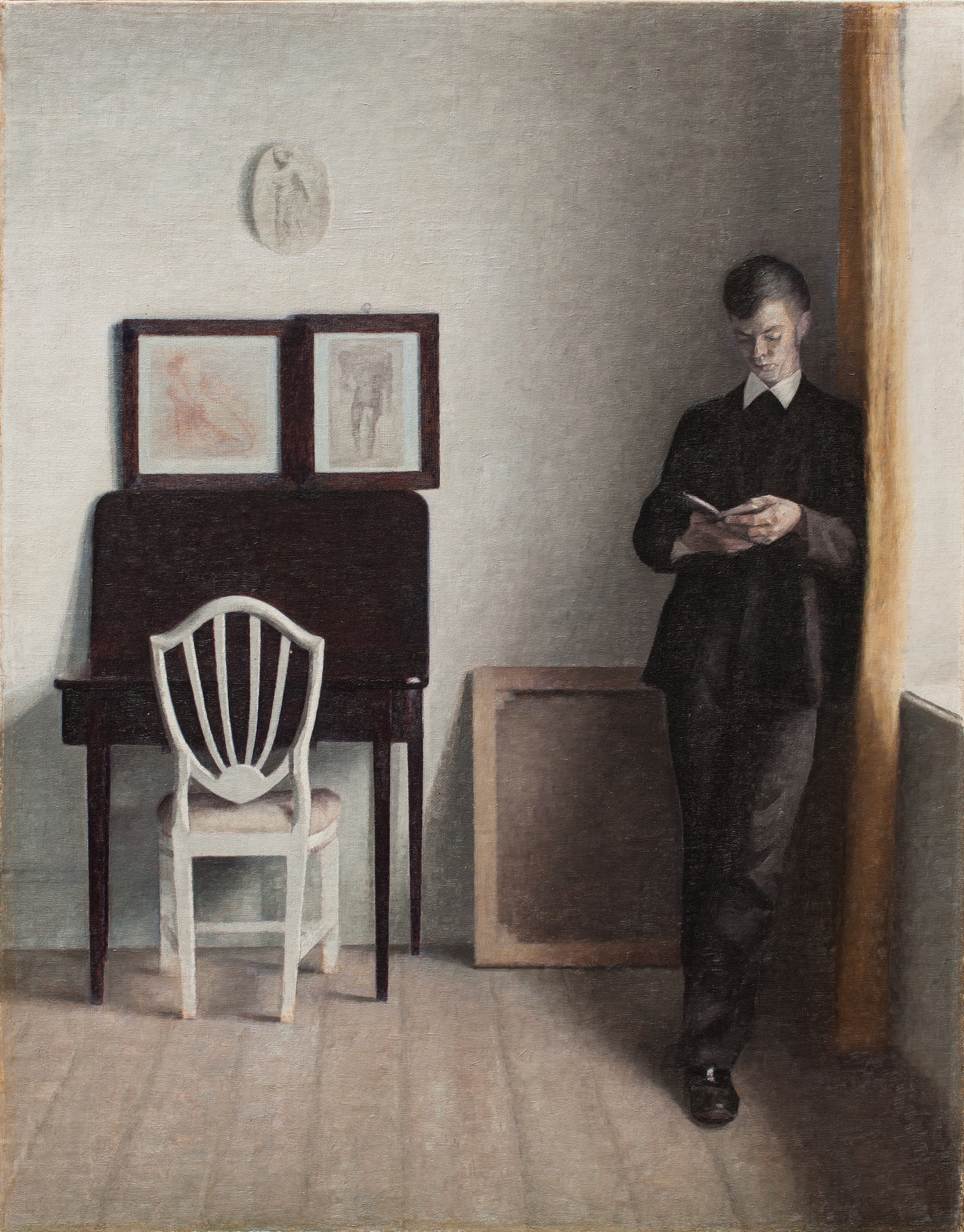
Vilhelm Hammershøi: Interior with Young Man Reading, 1898

Theodor Philipsen (1840–1920) through his personal contact with Paul Gauguin became the sole Danish impressionist of his generation.

L. A. Ring (1854–1933), famous for his involvement in Danish symbolism, specialised in paintings of village life and landscapes in the south of Zealand.

Paul Gustave Fischer (1860–1934) was a romantic impressionistic painter specialising in city street scenes and bright bathing compositions.

Vilhelm Hammershøi (1864–1916) was considered something of an enigma in his lifetime but is now remembered mainly for his subdued paintings of interiors, usually empty spaces (as in Dust Motes Dancing in Sunbeams) but occasionally with a solitary figure.

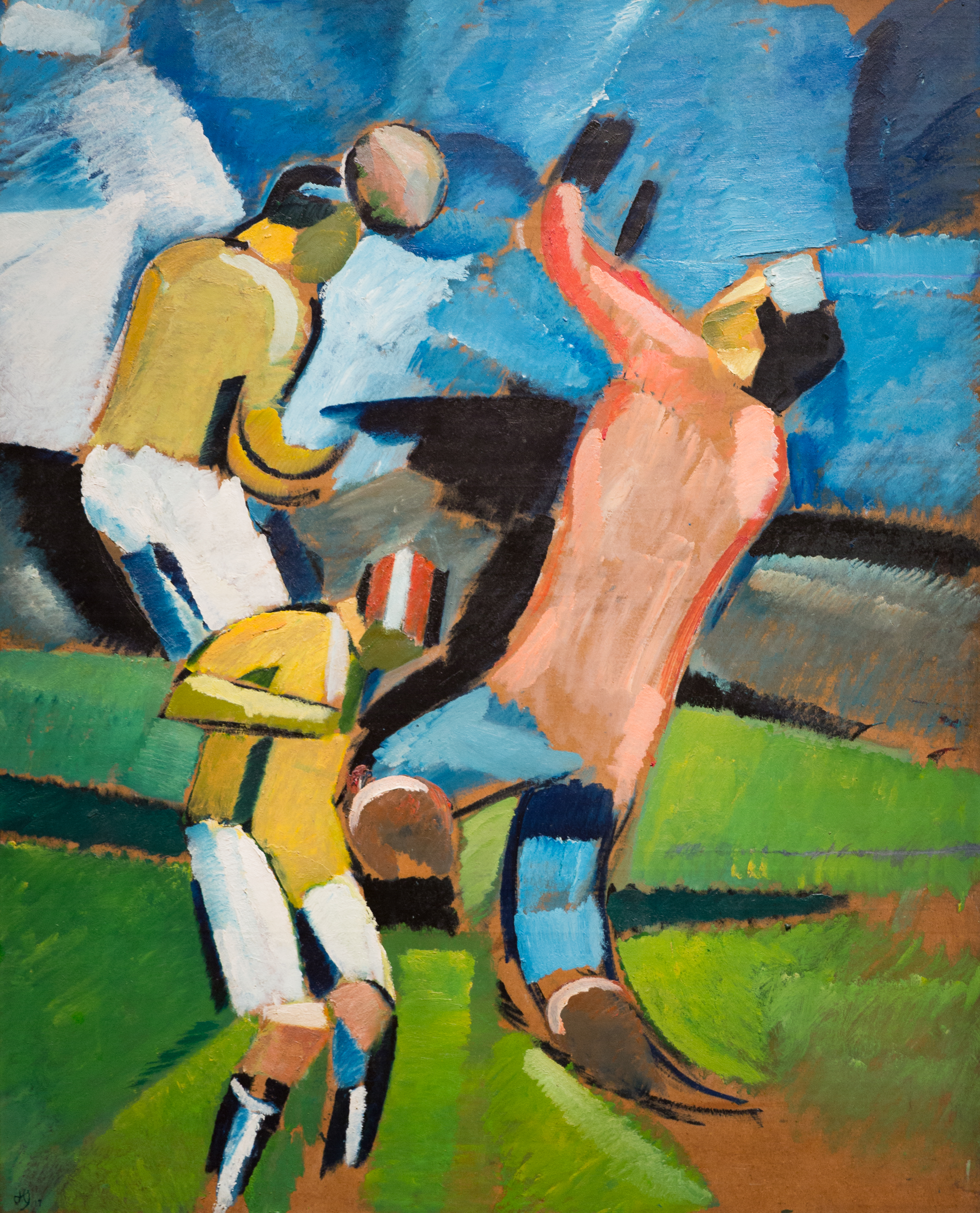
Harald Giersing: Fodboldspillere. Sofus header (Soccer players. Sofus heads), 1917

Danish expressionist landscape painting developed between the world wars with Jens Søndergaard and Oluf Høst as its main representatives. In parallel, younger artists such as Niels Lergaard, Lauritz Hartz and Karl Bovin adopted the light French colours and formalism of modernism, founding the Corner group of artists in 1932. Around the same time, Edvard Weie, the Swedish artist Karl Isakson, Olaf Rude, Kræsten Iversen, Oluf Høst and Niels Lergaard were attracted by the natural beauty of the Baltic islands of Bornholm and the much smaller Christiansø. Together they initiated the so-called Bornholm School providing the basis of the permanent exhibition at the Bornholm Art Museum near Gudhjem. Painters of nature and everyday life such as Erik Hoppe and Knud Agger initiated the highly successful Grønningen association which provided a platform for exhibitions in Copenhagen.

Sigurd Swane (1879–1973) was initially influenced by the work of the Fauves in Paris when he began a series of paintings of woodlands rich in greens, yellows and blues. He later painted a number of light-filled landscapes while living on a farm in Odsherred in north-western Zealand.

Harald Giersing (1881–1927) was instrumental in developing the classic modernism movement in Denmark around 1910–1920.

Vilhelm Lundstrøm (1893–1950), one of the greatest modernists, brought French cubism to Denmark. He is remembered for his still-life paintings with oranges and for cubistic scenes with nudes. His later work developed into much looser modern art with contrasting colours and form.

Richard Mortensen (1910–1993) was an important surrealistic painter, inspired by Wassily Kandinsky. He was a joint founder of the "Linien" group of artists and also a member of the Grønningen group. His later expressionist works exhibit large, clear, brightly coloured surfaces.

Asger Jorn (1914–1973) was a Danish artist, sculptor, writer and ceramist. Looking for inspiration outside Denmark, he traveled widely. After meeting artists such as Constant Nieuwenhuys, Appel and Dotremont, he became the driving force behind the Cobra group where he excelled in ceramics but also continued to paint in oils.

Danish design became of international importance in the decades after World War II, especially in furniture, where it pioneered a style sometimes known as Danish modern. The style is a forerunner of the general Scandinavian Design style later popularized and mass-produced by IKEA for example. Important designers in Danish modern include Finn Juhl (1912–1989), Hans Wegner (1914–2007) and Arne Jacobsen (1902–1971).

== Contemporary art ==
Collections of modern art enjoy unusually attractive settings at the Louisiana Museum north of Copenhagen and at the North Jutland Art Museum in Aalborg. The National Museum of Art and the Glyptotek, both in Copenhagen, contain treasures of Danish and international art.

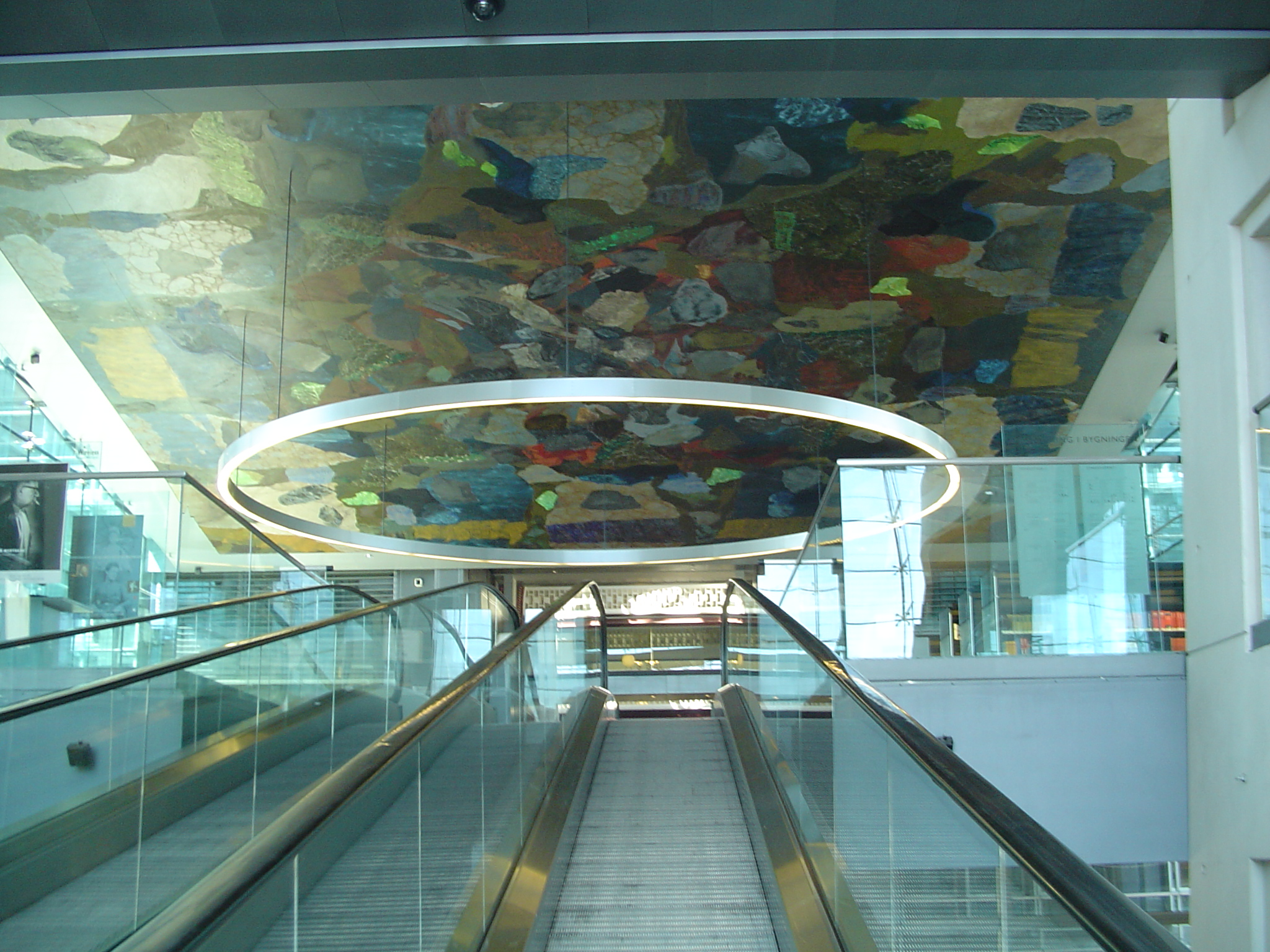
Per Kirkeby: fresco (unnamed), Black Diamond, Copenhagen (1999)

- Richard Winther (1926–2007) a talented Danish artist, started his long career in the arts aged 10. He worked on themes exploring mediums such as painting, photography, and ceramics. He is considered as one of the founders of the Linien II movement, part of concrete art at the time. Several known artists, such as Per Kirkeby and Tal R, have been greatly influenced by Richard Winther. Many of his paintings were done on canvas and masonite, but in an effort to simplify his art he not only diminished the number of colors he used but also switched to paint on cardboard. He was not shy about revisiting a theme and many years later amended some of his works. Also several of his works are presented on both sides of the same cardboard. He used photographic cameras to compose art and when he was not satisfied with the capabilities of the machines, he started making his own designs. He is known for his 360-degree cameras, instruments which are objects of art in themselves. Among the many prizes he was awarded, were the Eckersberg Medal (1971), Thorvaldsen Medal (1997) and the Prince Eugen Medal.
- Per Kirkeby (1938–2018), a student of Richard Winther at Eks-skolen has produced an impressive body of neo-expressionistic artwork on masonite, canvas, blackboards and paper as well as various sculptures and even architecture. Initially interested in pop art, his colourful paintings have been exhibited widely, most recently at the Tate Modern in London. Educated as a geologist, his interest in terrain and nature in general is still in evidence in his painting.
- Merete Barker (born 1944) uses sketches and photographs from her many travels as the basis for highly expressive paintings where it is often difficult to distinguish between nature and culture.
- Elmgreen and Dragset have worked together since 1995 producing work which explores the relationship between art, architecture and design. Michael Elmgreen (born 1961), a Dane, and Ingar Dragset (born 1968), a Norwegian draw on institutional critique, social politics, performance and architecture, reconfiguring everyday objects and situations with wit and subversive humour.
- Tal R, born in Israel in 1967, produces wild and colourful paintings, combining shapes and imagery with a reduced palette consisting of black, white, pink, green, red, yellow and brown. Inspired by everything from the Holocaust to children's comic books, his widely exhibited work builds on the old tradition of autonomy and expression.
- Olafur Eliasson (born 1967) has attracted wide interest in his public space exhibitions such as the New York City Waterfalls (2008), the Weather Project at London's Tate Modern gallery in 2003 and the Take Your Time exhibit at MoMA in New York (2008).
- Jeppe Hein (born 1974) produces interactive art works or installations, often activated by the spectator. Among these are his Shaking Cube (2004), Moving Benches (2000), The Curve (2007) and his Space in Action / Action in Space (2002) exhibited at the 2003 Venice Biennale. He is now working on a major exhibit for the Danish pavilion at Expo 2010 in Shanghai.
- Jens Galschiøt (born 1954) political sculptor, often highlighting violation of human rights through his art. He has made many happenings worldwide, including my inner beast in Austria, Belgium, Switzerland, Sweden, France, Norway, Italy, Holand, Spain, and in 1997 the Pillar of Shame in China, Mexico, Brazil.

=== Margrethe II's tapestries ===
On the occasion of her 50th birthday in 1990, Queen Margrethe II decided to use a gift from industry of 13 million Danish crowns to produce a series of tapestries tracing the history of Denmark from the beginnings to the present day. Woven by the historic Manufacture des Gobelins in Paris, the tapestries were based on full-sized sketches by the versatile Danish artist Bjørn Nørgaard. Completed in 1999, they now hang in the Great Hall at Christiansborg Palace

=== Architecture ===
Following in the footsteps of Arne Jacobsen, Denmark has had some outstanding successes in contemporary architecture. Johann Otto von Spreckelsen, relying on simple geometrical figures, designed the Grande Arche at La Défense in Puteaux, near Paris. Prolific Henning Larsen designed the Foreign Ministry building in Riyadh, as well as a variety of prestige buildings throughout Scandinavia, including the recently completed Copenhagen Opera House. Jørn Utzon's iconic Sydney Opera House earned him the distinction of becoming only the second person to have his work recognized as a World Heritage Site while still alive. Bjarke Ingels whom the Wall Street Journal in October 2011 named the Innovator of the Year for architecture and, in July 2012, cited him as "rapidly becoming one of the design world's rising stars" in light of his extensive international projects.

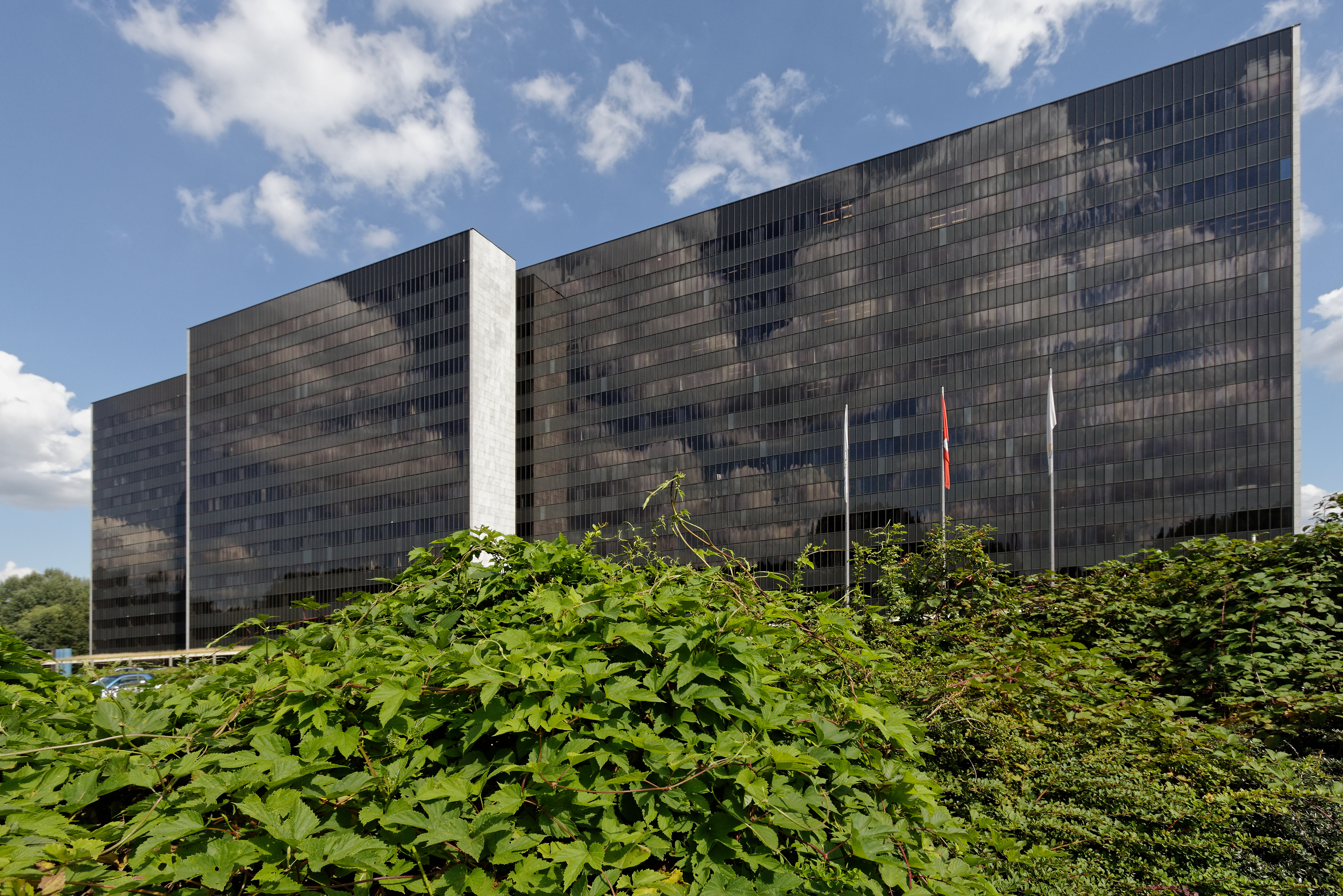
Überseering 12 in Hamburg (Arne Jacobsen, 1969).

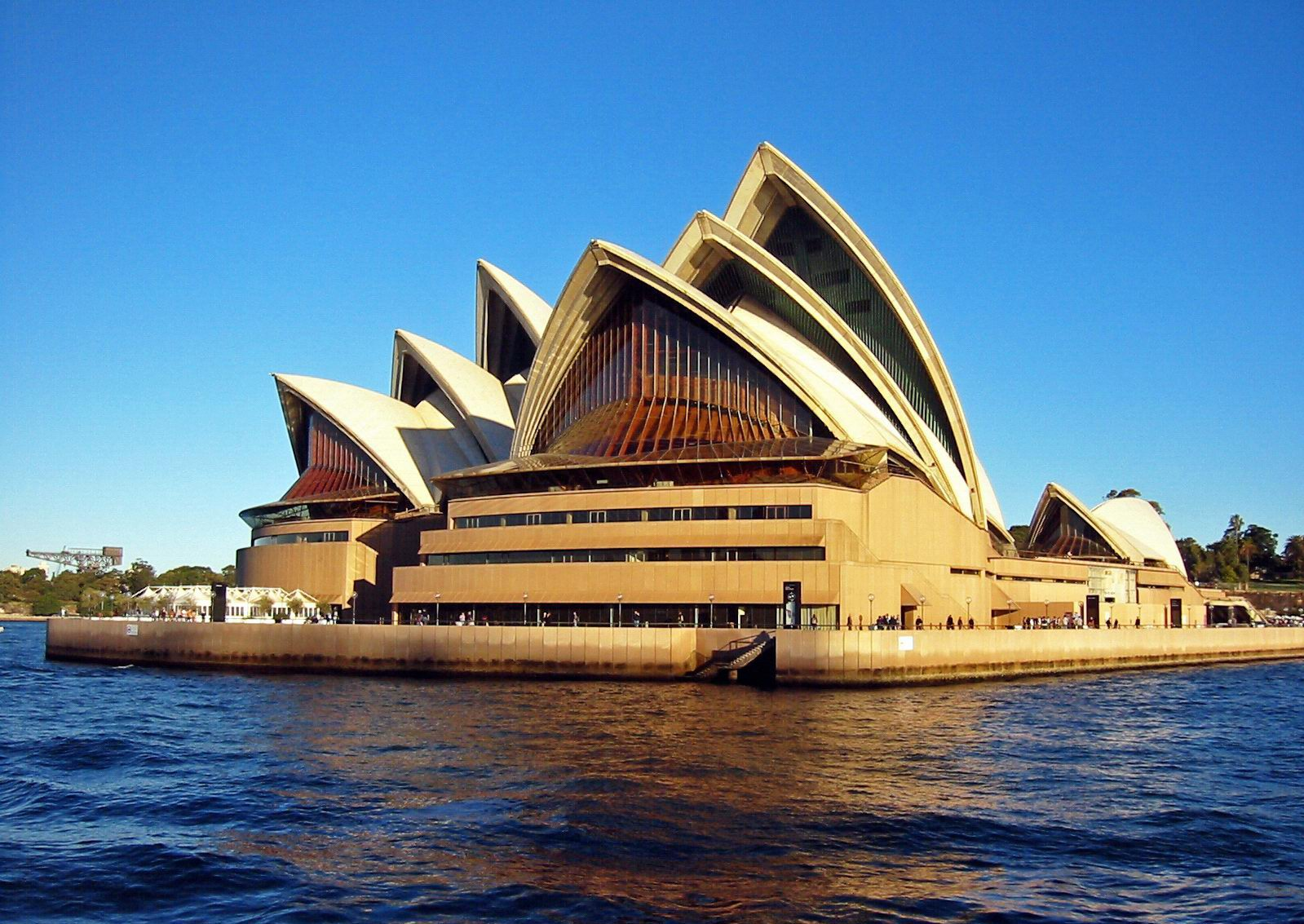
Sydney Opera House (Jørn Utzon, 1973). Danish architects have been engaged across the world.

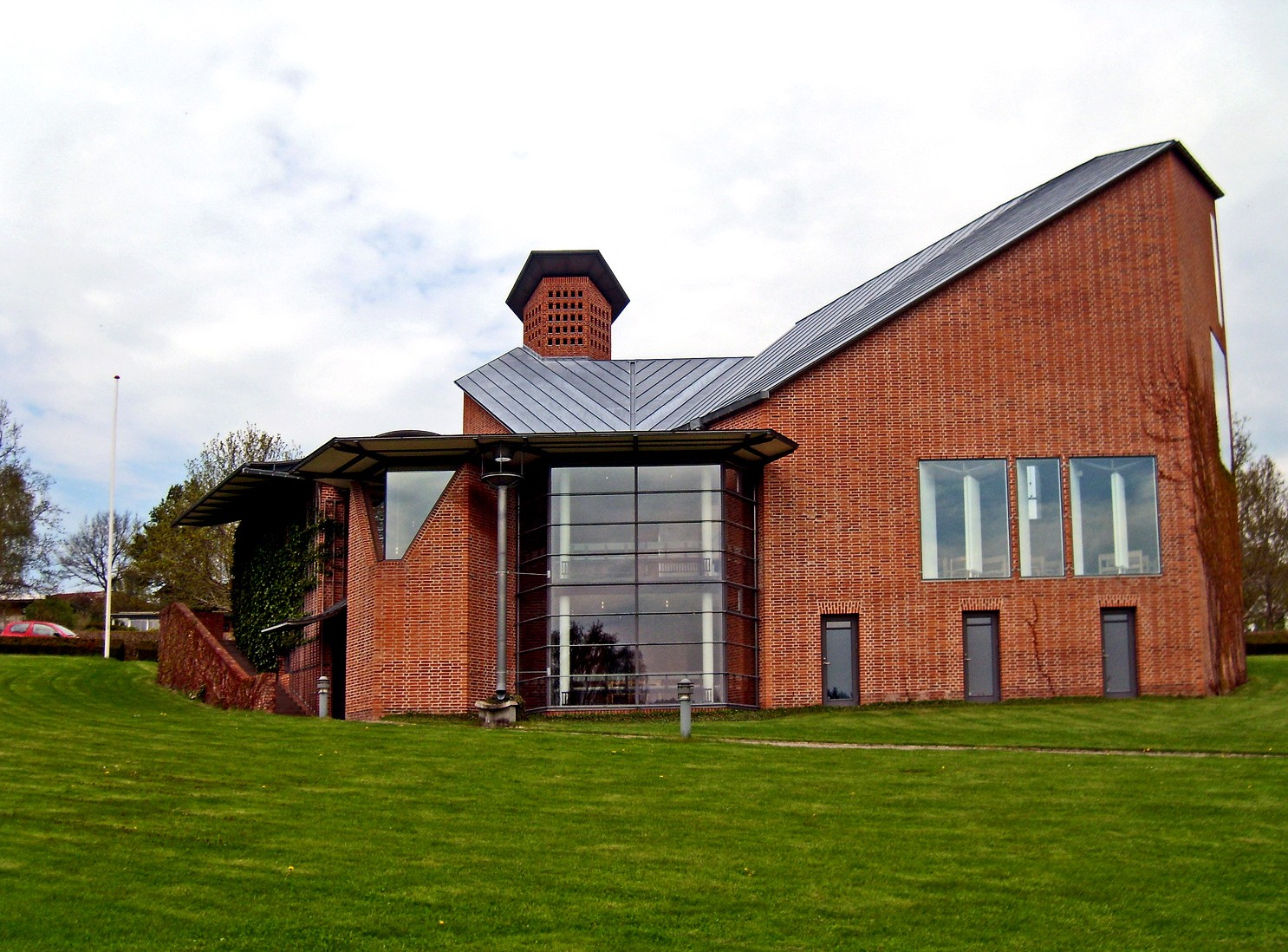
Virklund Church in Silkeborg (Inger and Johannes Exner, 1994). Brick is a prominent material in Danish architecture.

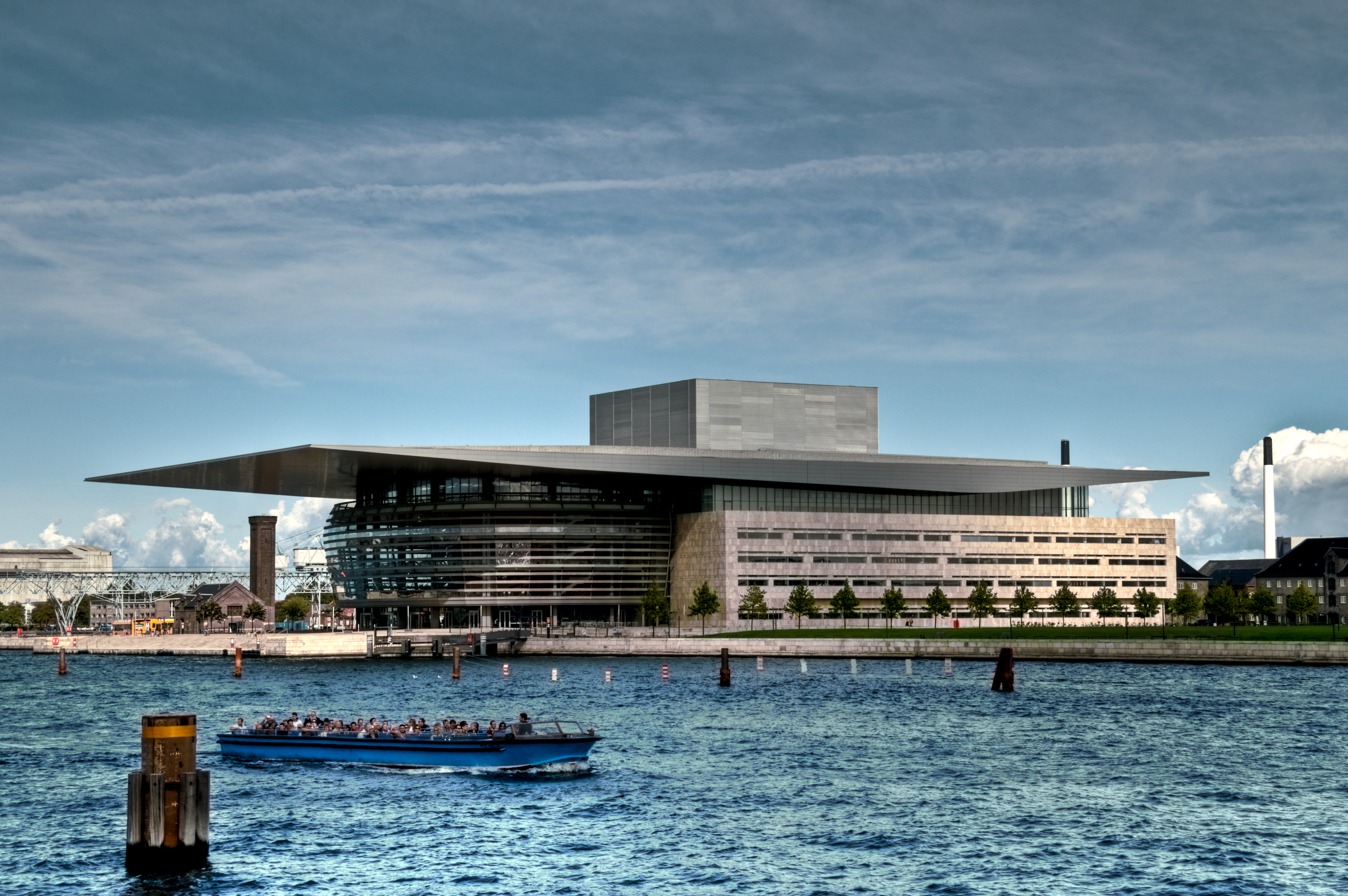
Copenhagen Opera House (Henning Larsen, 2004)

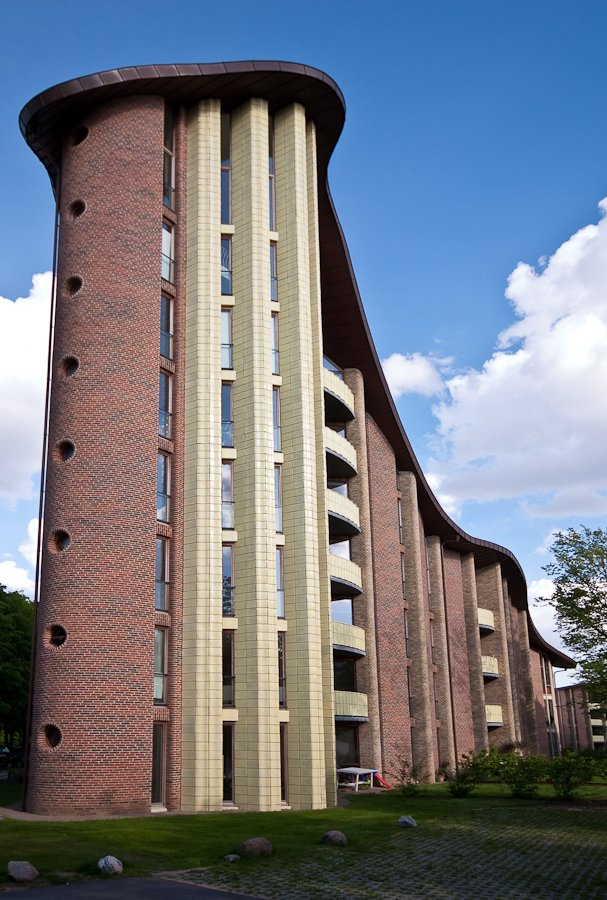
Bispebjerg Bakke in Copenhagen (2006). A postmodern building designed in collaboration with artist Bjørn Nørgaard.

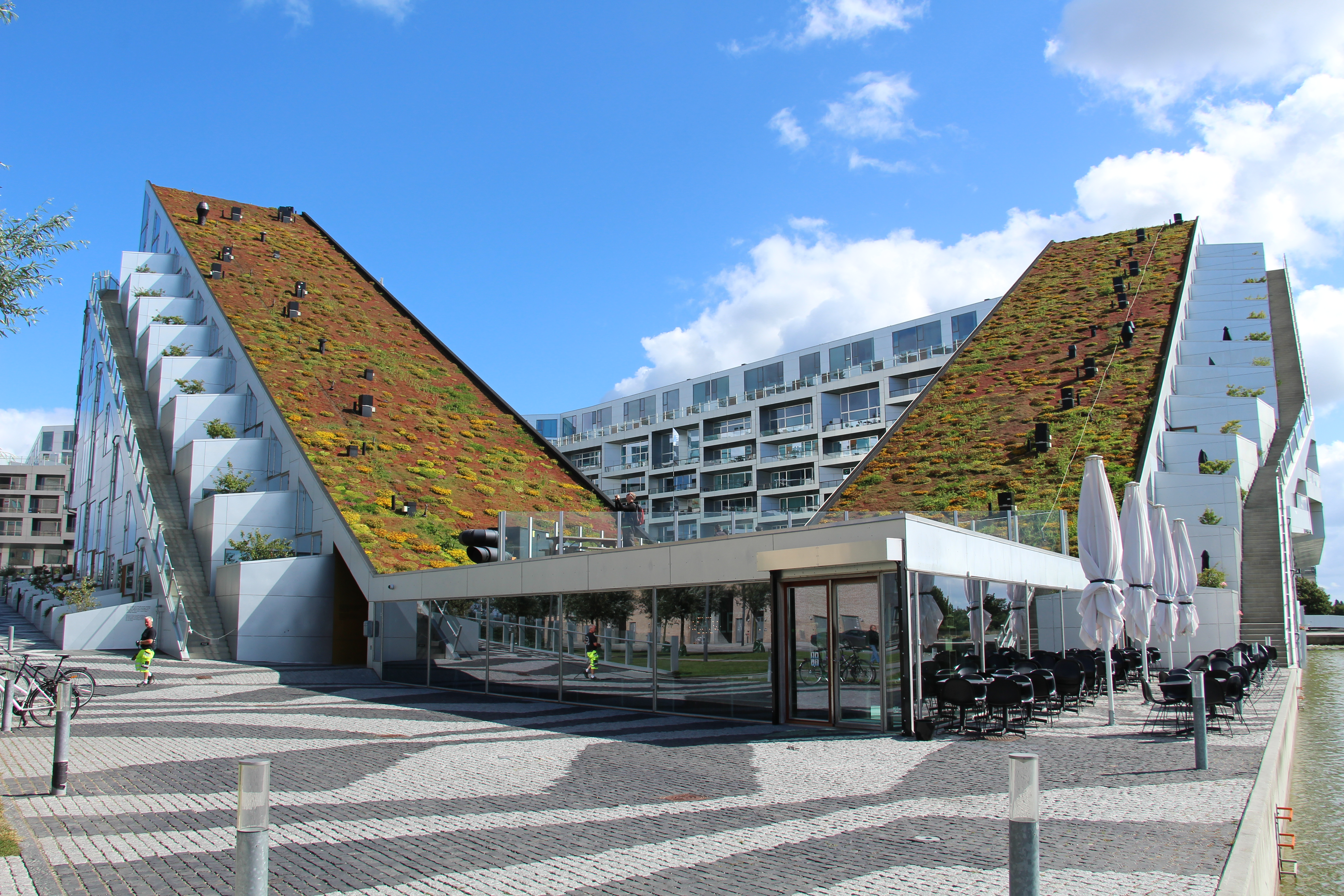
8 House (2010) by Bjarke Ingels Group (BIG).

== Museums ==
The most significant museums for Danish art are:

In Copenhagen:

- Statens Museum for Kunst
- Ny Carlsberg Glyptotek
- The Hirschsprung Collection
- Danish Museum of Art & Design, mainly modern design

Elsewhere:

- ARoS Aarhus Kunstmuseum
- Louisiana Museum of Modern Art
- KUNSTEN Museum of Modern Art Aalborg
- Funen's Art Museum, Odense
- Museum Jorn, Silkeborg

and others in Category:Art museums and galleries in Denmark.

== See also ==
- Architecture of Denmark
- Culture of Denmark
- Danish sculpture
- List of Danish painters
- Photography of Denmark
