= Gottfred Eickhoff =

Danish sculptor (1902-82)

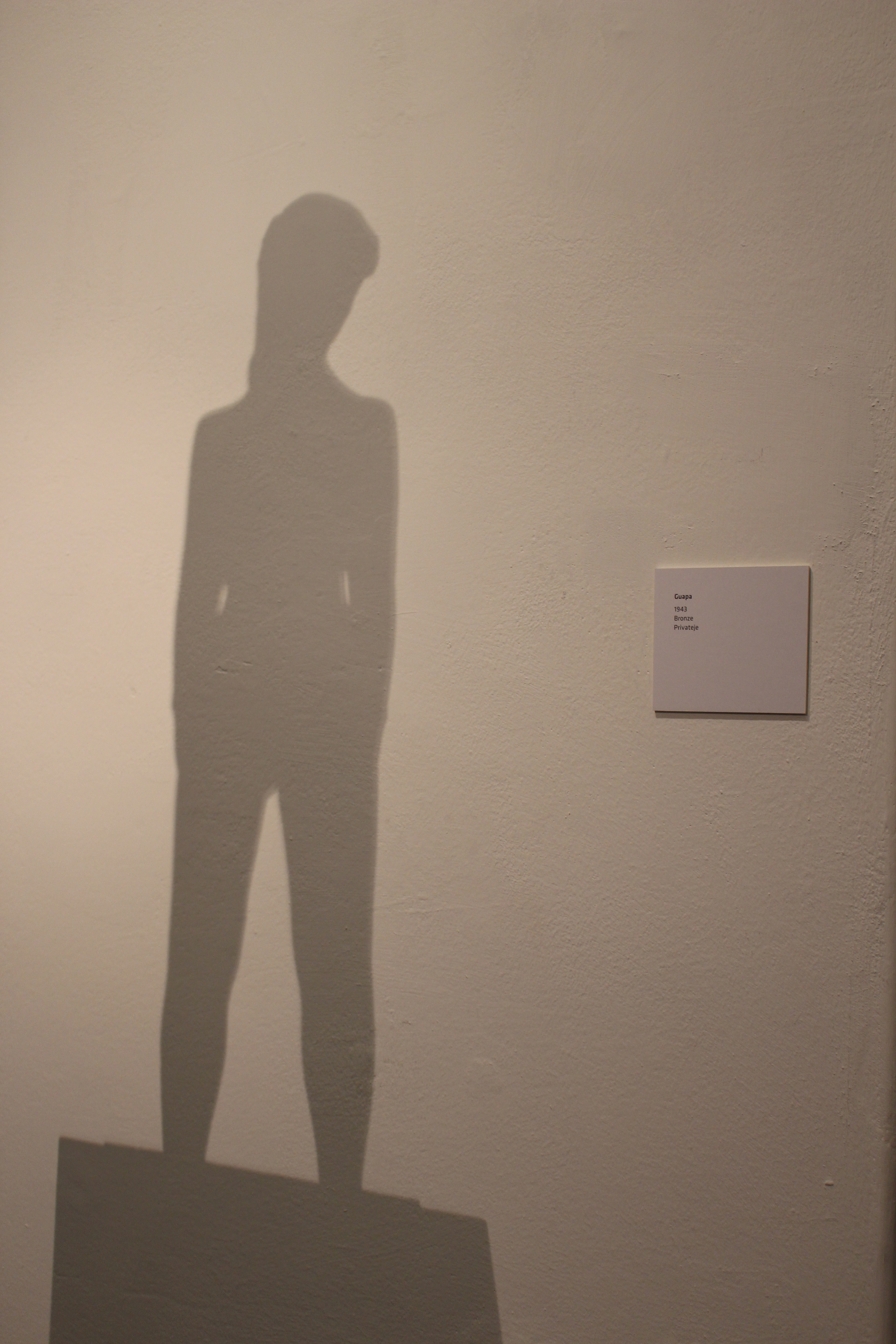
The shadow of Eickhoff's sculpture Guapa on the wall of Thorvaldsens Museum, 2016.

Gottfred Eickhoff (11 April 1902 in Frederiksberg – 26 July 1982) was a Danish sculptor. Inspired by French trends, his work contrasted with that of his predecessors, exhibiting a spirit of harmony, peace and balance.

== Early life ==
After matriculating from high school in 1920, Eickhoff embarked on law studies but changed paths in 1926 when he became a pupil of Harald Giersing. Realizing he would now concentrate on sculpture, he continued his studies in Paris from 1927 to 1933 under Charles Despiau, associating with a wide range of sculptors including Jean Osouf and Paul Cornet from France, Charles Leplae from Belgium, Han Wezelaar from the Netherlands, Bror Hjorth from Sweden and Adam Fischer and Astrid Noack from Denmark.

== Career ==
In 1933, he exhibited with the Grønningen artists, becoming a member of the association in 1935. His works immediately attracted considerable interest: his busts Kvindehoved. Merete Bodelsen (limestone, 1931) and Gerda (clay, 1932) were acquired by Statens Museum for Kunst and the Carlsberg Foundation. He received a stipendium from the foundation allowing him to make an extended tour of Italy, Greece, Egypt and Turkey in 1936. His works from this period follow the French trends of Aristide Maillol and Charles Despiau, contrasting with Danish designs. Works from this period include Marseillepiger (limestone, 1935), Corfupige (bronze, 1939) and Roepiger (bronze, 1939) which now stands on the market place in Sakskøbing. His bronze female figure Guapa can be seen outside the Ny Carlsberg Glyptotek in Copenhagen.

After the war, he travelled to Italy, Spain and Morocco before becoming a professor at the Danish Academy in 1954. He frequently sketched during his travels, producing such prized works as a drawing of a cow deprived of its calf in San Cataldo (1952) and of a shop in Zauen, Morocco (1953). His drawings demonstrate his skills at light and shade, reminiscent of Goya and Rembrandt. Later in life, he used his drawings as a basis for sculpted works.

== Style ==
His sculptures are modelled with harmony, peace and balance, based on nature as a precondition. They contrast with those of previous generations, differing from the exuberance of Kai Nielsen and the ornamentation of Johannes Bjerg and Einar Utzon-Frank. Many of his works have been carefully reproduced in various sizes.

== Selected works ==
Public art

- Mother With Cjildm Præstø, Denmark (1972)
- Rycho Brahe, Børre Allé, Copenhagen, Denmark

== Awards ==
Eickhoff received the Eckersberg Medal in 1944 and the Thorvaldsen Medal in 1976.
