= Merete Barker =

Danish artist

Merete Barker (born 1944) is a Danish artist who uses sketches and photographs from her many travels as the basis for highly expressive paintings where it is often difficult to distinguish between nature and culture.

She has received various honorary scholarships, as well as the Eckersberg Medal and the Danish Arts Foundation's Lifelong Artist's Grant.

== Career ==
Educated at the Royal Danish Academy of Fine Arts (1966–1973), she became a member of the Ny Abstraktion group in 1977 and in 1989 of Grønningen. Her abstract approach to recognizable subjects and themes combines the constructive with the expressive, often in minimalistic series of wood carvings and reliefs. From 1976, digital graphics became an important tool for Barker. At the end of the 1980s, nature's organic universe became an important concern. Journeys to New York, Mexico and Turkey have been the basis for her paintings which build on the shapes and colours of towns and landscapes.

She has also produced a number of decorative works, for example for the Specialarbejderskole in Aarhus (1985), which forms an integral part of the architecture.

Her works are present in many Danish art museums. She was awarded the Eckersberg Medal in 1995.

== Bibliography ==
- "Min lange rejse. Merete Barker og maleriet", Ole Lindboe, Gads Forlag, 2004
