= Klingen (magazine) =

Danish art magazine (1917–1920)

- Categories: Art magazine
- Founder: Axel Salto
- Founded: 1917
- First issue: October 1917
- Final issue: November 1920
- Country: Denmark
- Based in: Copenhagen
- Language: Danish
- ISSN: 1395-2706
- OCLC: 467809661

Klingen (Danish: Blade) was an art magazine based in Copenhagen, Denmark. The magazine existed between 1917 and 1920.

== History and profile ==
Klingen was established in 1917, and the first issue appeared in October 1917. The magazine was inspired from the German magazine Der Sturm and the Swedish magazine Flamman. Its founder was the painter and graphic artist Axel Salto. The magazine was based in Copenhagen.

Klingen is cited as a significant vehicle for the entrance of modernism in Denmark. In addition, it was instrumental in expanding avant-garde art into Nordic countries.

Klingen had significant effects on painters, writers and intellectuals in the region. The magazine particularly emphasized the significance of new artistic approaches such as cubism and expressionism which would be adopted by the Danish painters Vilhelm Lundstrøm and Harald Giersing. The artists attached to the magazine had an optimistic view following World War I, and argued that the beauty in art had social and political significance providing a means of understanding and responding to the chaotic situation of post-war Europe.

Major contributors of Klingen included Otto Gelsted, Emil Bønnelycke, Poul Henningsen and Sophus Danneskjold-Samsøe. Klingen ceased publication in November 1920 after producing a total of thirty-six issues. In 1942 an anniversary issue was published. Klingen was one of the magazines which inspired the Danish arts magazine Helhesten.

Several issues of Klingen were digitized by the Royal Library of Denmark in 1996. All issues, including the 1942 anniversary issue, of the magazine are also archived under the Blue Mountain Project of Princeton University.

== See also ==
- List of avant-garde magazines
- List of magazines in Denmark
