= Grønningen =

Danish artists cooperative

Grønningen is a Danish artists cooperative whose members arrange exhibitions and similar events. Founded in 1915, it is one of the oldest and most important groupings of its kind in Denmark and currently has 54 members. It is named after the street Grønningen in Copenhagen where the first art exhibition was held.

Initially, it brought together artists interested in radical and experimental art who had been members of Den Frie Udstilling ("The Free Exhibition"). Most prominent in the early years were artists such as Harald Giersing, Sigurd Swane, Olaf Rude, William Scharff, Fritz Syberg and Johannes Larsen. They were soon joined by Vilhelm Lundstrøm, Svend Johansen, Axel Salto, Jens Søndergaard, Niels Lergaard, Erik Hoppe, Christine Swane, Astrid Noack and Gottfred Eickhoff. Later came Erik Werner, Eiler Krag, Ib Spang Olsen, Lars Bo and Bo Bojesen. During the 1940s, abstract art was introduced by Richard Mortensen and Egill Jacobsen.

The annual exhibitions are now held in the Charlottenborg Exhibition Hall and feature key foreign artists.

== See also ==
- Art of Denmark
- Den Frie Udstilling
- De Tretten
