= Harald Giersing =

Danish painter (1881–1927)

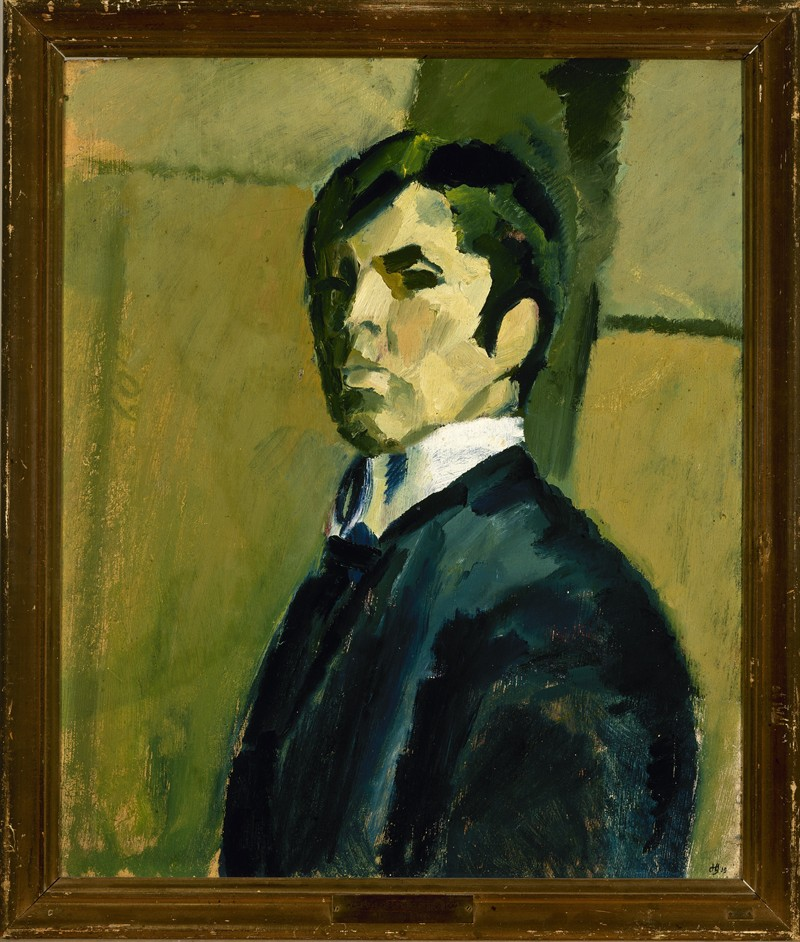
- Harald Giersing, Self-portrait, 1915
- Born: 24 April 1881; Copenhagen, Denmark
- Died: 15 January 1927 (aged 45); Copenhagen, Denmark
- Education: Royal Danish Academy of Fine Arts
- Known for: Painting
- Movement: Modernism

Harald Giersing (24 April 1881 – 15 January 1927) was a Danish painter. He was instrumental in developing the classic modernism movement in Denmark around 1910-1920. He is remembered as one of Denmark's most important 20th-century artists both for his portraits and landscapes.

== Life and development ==
Giersing, who died at the early age of 45, was driven by a desire to concentrate on change and beauty. Unable to find support in religion, he adopted modernism as an existential approach as to how art could fill the void for those without faith in God. While some synergies with the work of Vilhelm Lundstrøm can be detected, he differed from contemporaries such as Niels Larsen Stevns, Sigurd Swane and Edvard Weie in that he sought to represent images just as he had seen them, almost in the form of photographs.

When he arrived in Paris in 1906, he was immediately taken by Gauguin but within a year it was Édouard Manet who became his ideal, soon to be followed by Cézanne and also the neo-impressionist Paul Signac. By 1907, he had begun to show interest in the Fauvists, including Derain, Othon Friesz, Manguin, Marquet and Puy and especially Braque. All this experience helped him to attain his own way of thinking, although he was ever wary of becoming "complete" as he believed it would inhibit his further development as an artist.

He soon adopted a heavy, rather rough style with rough colours, partly inspired by Ernst Ludwig Kirchner. His painting The Judgment of Paris (1909) presents three female figures with broad dark blue outlines and rather confusing proportions.

After a period during which he concentrated on portraits and on the female figure, from about 1912 he took a special interest in painting forests. He developed a wilder, more spontaneous style using a palette knife rather than brush strokes as can be seen in his Forest Path Sorø (1916), one of his many successful forest works. Open landscapes followed, especially the Furesø pictures from 1918 on.

== The Grønningen association ==
In 1914, unhappy with the lack of success of Ung Dansk Kunst (Young Danish Art), Giersing formed a new association called Grønningen, in which he took a leading role. This provided him with a basis for contributing to the early issues of a young artists' new periodical Klingen. He was soon recognised as the authority answering those who refused to accept new ideas, encouraging his disciples to fight and endure.

== Football and ballet ==
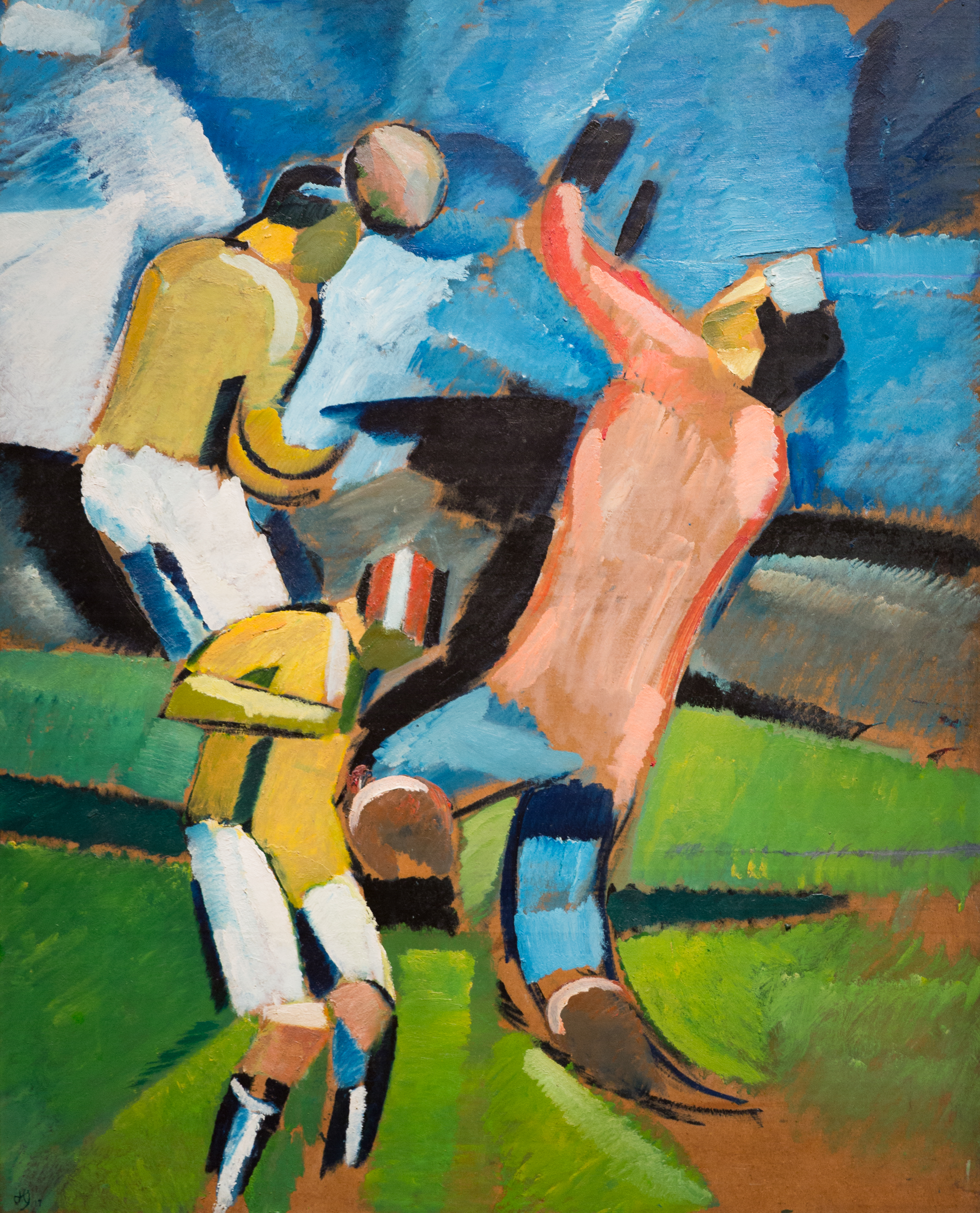
Sofus Heading, 1917

For many years, Giersing had taken a special interest in painting football scenes. However, it was not until 1917 that he adapted his approach to a rather aggressive and dynamic cubist interpretation as can be seen in Sofus Heading from 1917. The football paintings, like his ballet scenes, were based on photographs as starting points. In these vivid pictures, the dancers have no eyes or their faces are covered by masks.

== The final years ==
In 1917, as he was becoming increasingly successful and more widely recognised as the leader of Denmark's younger painters, he married Besse Syberg, one of his students, who also became his favourite model. Soon afterwards, Besse's father Fritz Syberg gave her a small cottage at Svanninge in the south of Funen where Giersing spend several summers painting some 40 pictures. Here the landscapes became constructed pictures where the countryside was expressed in a few lush green colours. Another favourite motif of the period was the churchyard near Svanninge church.

For Giersing, the 1920s did not bring the level of success he might have hoped for. After the war, Copenhagen lost many of its attractions for artists who moved to other parts of Europe. At the 1922 Grønningen exhibition in Copenhagen, Giersing exhibited almost exclusively black and grey pictures such as the Three Ladies in Black (1919), surprisingly attracting far more positive reviews. Finally, in his latter years he returned to more colourful still lifes. He died of pneumonia on 15 January 1927.

== Gallery ==
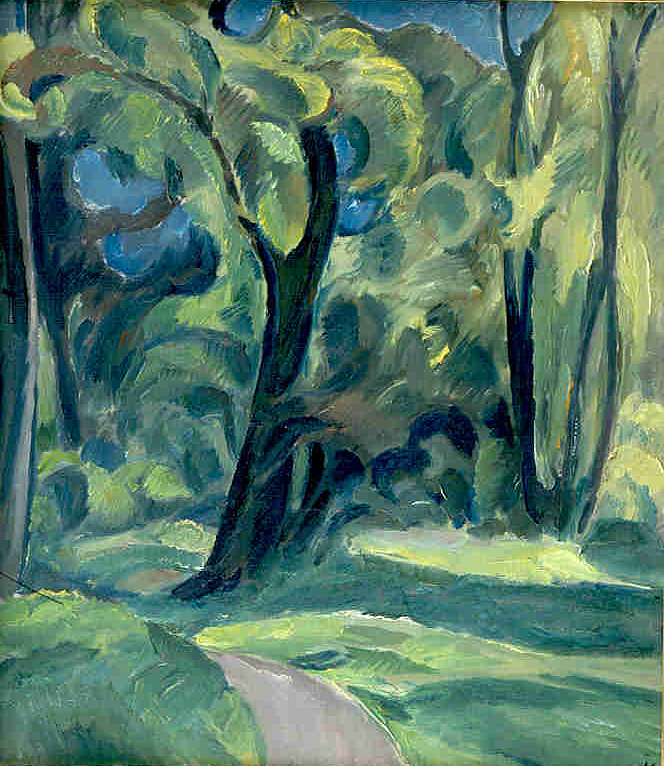
Inside the forest near Sorø, 1915

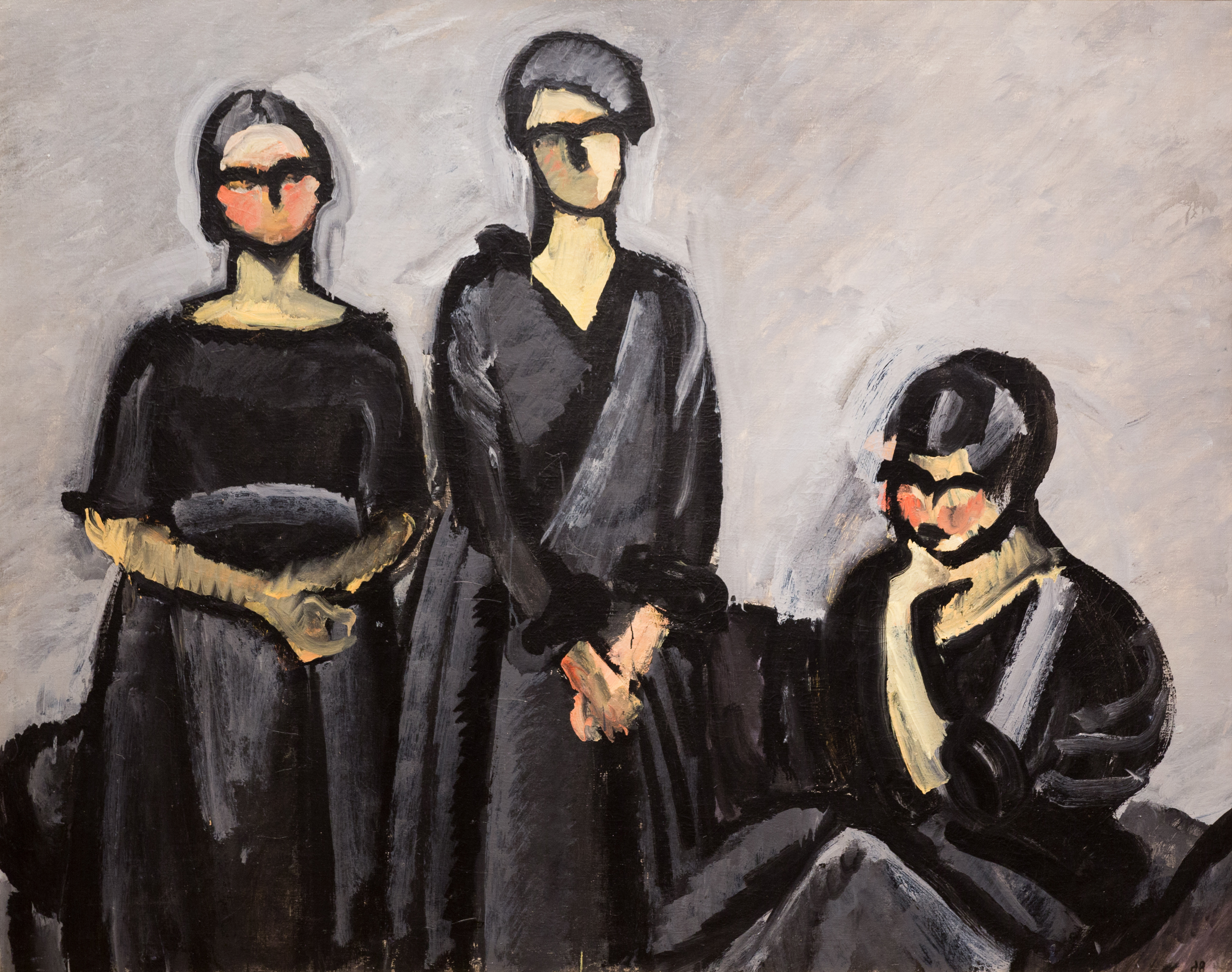
Three Ladies in Black, 1923

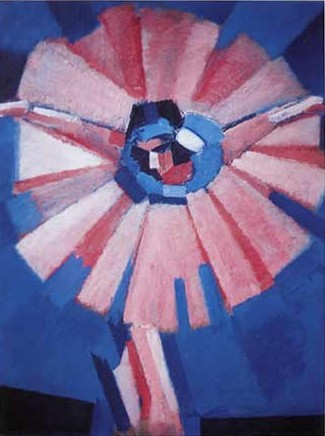
Ballet dancer, 1918

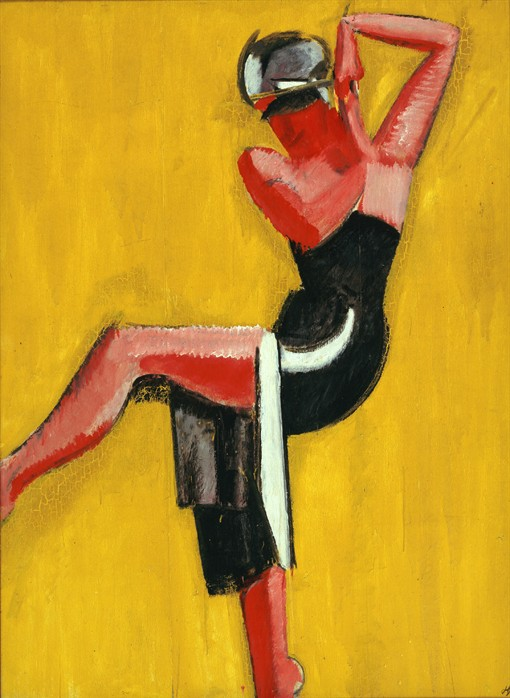
Dancer on yellow background, 1920

== See also ==
- Art of Denmark
