= Svend Johansen =

Danish painter and scenographer (1890–1970)

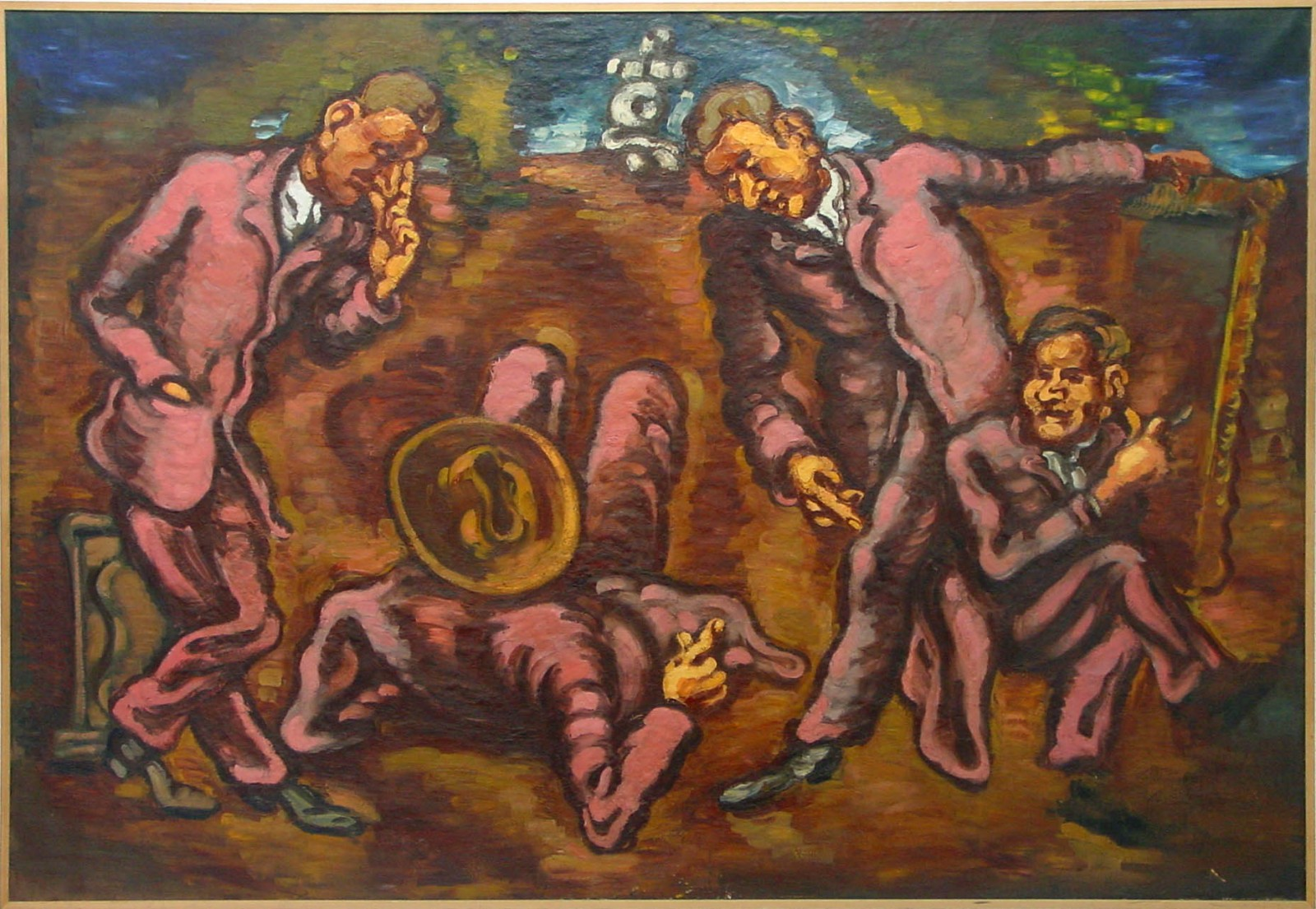
- Born: 10 September 1890; Gentofte
- Died: 6 October 1970; Gentofte Municipality

Svend Johansen (10 September 1890 – 6 October 1970) was a Danish painter, scenographer and illustrator.

== Biography ==
Born in Gentofte, Johansen attended the Copehangen Technical School where he met Poul Henningsen who became a friend and associate for the rest of his life. He studied painting at the Royal Danish Academy of Fine Arts from 1912 to 1916 under P. Rostrup Bøyesen.

In 1919, he began an extended stay in France where he met Vilhelm Lundstrøm in Paris in 1922. Together with Karl Larsen and Axel Salto, Johansen and Lundstrøm settled in Bormes near Cannes, establishing the artistic group De Fire. They exhibited together until 1930. Johansen became a member of the Grønningen artists association in 1933, exhibiting there for many years. His stay in Bormes had brightened up his paintings, possibly under the influence of Henri Matisse and Auguste Renoir, depicting nude women and landscapes of the south of France. In addition to richly coloured prints, he also produced posters for Grønningen, Tuborg and for the theatre. He contributed sketches to Politikens Magasin and illustrated books by Pierre Louÿs, François Rabelais and Johan Herman Wessel.

Johansen was perhaps most effective in contributing to scenic design in the theatre. From 1924, he brought new life into stage decoration in Tivoli's Sommerteater, including cubic curtain patterns. For productions of Maskarade, Bortførelsen fra Seraillet and Slaraffenland, he not only designed striking stage sets but also provided the costumes.

He also collaborated with Poul Henningsen in producing På ho'det (1929), a revue in Nørrebros Theater.

== Awards ==
In 1948, he was awarded the Eckersberg Medal and, in 1966, the Thorvaldsen Medal.

== Literature ==
- Abell, Kjeld; Henningsen, Poul; Nilsen, Hans Jacob; Alf Rolfsen; Jørgen Sandvad; Preben Wilmann (1962). Svend Johansen. G.E.C. Gads Forlag København.
- Zeuthen, Lotte Ladegaard (2000). Svend Johansen - som scenograf: speciale. Institut for Kunsthistorie og Teatervidenskab, Københavns Universitet.
