= Marquet =

Marquet is an occupational surname of French origin, which means a woodworker in marquetry. The name may refer to:

- Adrien Marquet (1884–1955), French politician
- Albert Marquet (1875–1947), French painter
- Andrée Marquet (born 1934), French organic chemist
- Charles Marquet (1820–1900), French naturalist and entomologist
- Claude Marquet (1869–1920), Australian cartoonist
- Élisabeth Marquet (born 1960), French politician
- François Marquet (born 1995), Belgian football player
- Georges Marquet (1886–1947), Belgian businessman
- Jaime Marquet (1710–1782), French architect
- Josh Marquet (born 1969), Australian cricket player
- Luc Marquet (born 1970), French volleyball player
- Mathieu Marquet (born 1994), Mauritian swimmer
- Maurice Marquet (born 1954), New Zealand field hockey player
- Paul Marquet (born 1969), Australian rugby player
- Sascha Marquet (born 1989), German football player

== Other uses ==
- Marquet, a fictional continent in Exandria and the main setting of the Critical Role's third campaign

== See also ==
- Marquette
- Marquardt
- Marquee
