= Olaf Rude =

Danish painter and professor

Olaf Rude, 1918, Sankt Georg og dragen (Saint George and the dragon), oil on canvas, 99.7 x 79.9 cm, ARoS Aarhus Kunstmuseum

Olaf Rude (26 April 1886 – 17 June 1957) was a Danish painter. He was a professor at the Royal Danish Academy of Art from 1953 to 1956. He is remembered in particular for his paintings of oak trees at Skejten on Lolland, two of which can be seen at Christiansborg.

== Biography ==
He was born in an area then in the Russian Empire (now in Estonia). As a child, he moved with his family to Frejlev (Guldborgsund Municipality) on the island of Lolland. In 1905, he studied at the Copenhagen Technical School and later at the Kunstnernes Frie Studieskole where he was taught by Kristian Zahrtmann and Johan Rohde.

In 1911, he travelled to Paris where he was inspired especially by Paul Cézanne. On returning to Denmark, he became one of the classic modernists who around the time of the First World War focused on formal representation concentrating on form, line and colour. His work was exhibited at Grønningen's first exhibition in 1915. In 1919, he moved to Bornholm where he specialised in landscape painting and became a member of the Bornholm school of painters.

Rude was one of Denmark's most important modernists, sometimes called Denmark's Matisse for his use of colour in his expressive landscapes.
