= Vilhelm Lundstrøm =

Danish modernist painter

Vilhelm Lundstrøm (26 May 1893 – 9 May 1950) was a Danish modernist painter. He was a central figure in early Danish experimental art and introduced French cubism to Denmark.

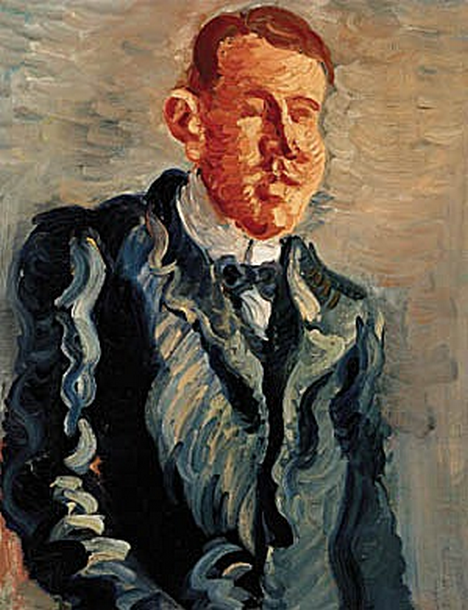
Vilhelm Lundstrøm self portrait, ca.1920

== Biography ==
Vilhelm Henry Lundstrøm was born in Copenhagen, Denmark. He was educated at the Royal Danish Academy of Art where he studied under Rostrup Böyesen. He made his debut in 1918 at the Artists' Autumn Exhibition at Den Frie Udstilling in Copenhagen and participated in the exhibition Modern Art in the Art Pavilion in Aarhus.

Lundstrøm spent an extended period in France in the 1920s where he was influenced by Braque, Picasso and Cézanne. Together with fellow artists Karl Larsen, Axel Salto and Svend Johansen, Lundstrøm settled in Bormes near Cannes and established the artistic group De Fire. He resided at Cagnes-sur-Mer from 1923 to 1932, during which period he painted his Portrait of Tusnelda Sanders (1928), currently in Oslo at the National Museum. From 1932, Lundstrøm had a permanent residence in Copenhagen.

Lundstrøm was an illustrator at the journal Klingen from the beginning of 1919 to the end of 1920. In 1937 he became a member of the Academy Council and was appointed professor at the Royal Danish Academy of Art in 1944.

He is remembered for his geometric still lifes with oranges, his cubistic scenes with nudes and his paintings of bottles, flasks and jugs. His style was characterised by clear, bright lines and few colours. In his later years, Lundstrøm adapted his style to looser modern art with contrasts in colors and form.

Vilhelm Lundstrøm died in Copenhagen and was buried at Sundby Cemetery.

== See also ==
- Art of Denmark
