= Bornholm Art Museum =

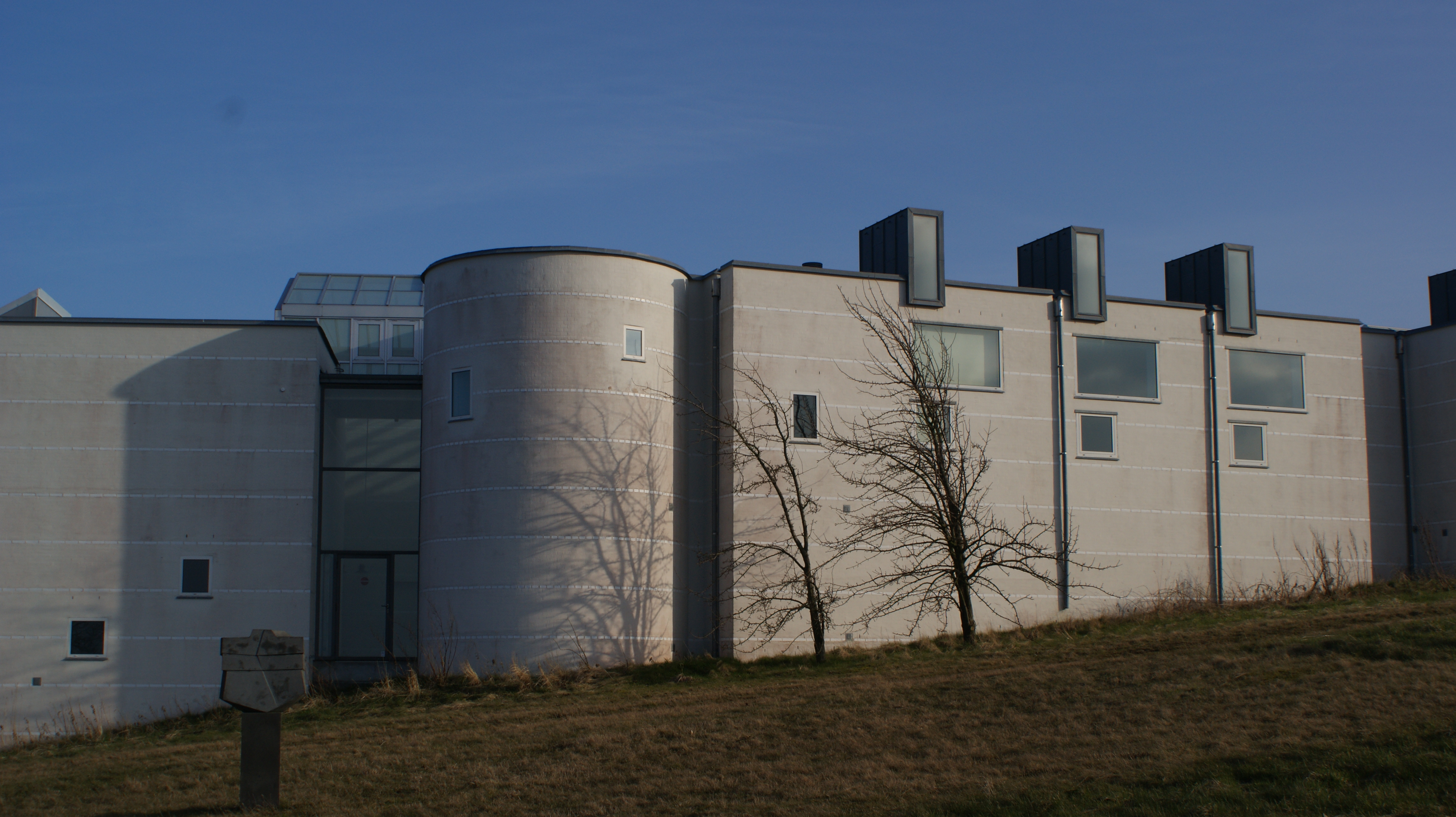
- Interactive fullscreen map
- Established: 1893
- Location: Bornholm, Denmark
- Coordinates: 55°13′25″N 14°53′39″E
- Type: Art museum
- Director: Lars Kærulf Møller
- Website: bornholmskunstmuseum.dk

The Bornholm Art Museum (Bornholms Kunstmuseum) is situated on the Danish island of Bornholm, above the Sanctuary Rocks (Helligdomsklipperne) about 6 kilometres north-west of Gudhjem, Denmark.

== History ==
The museum's permanent collection consists principally of paintings by artists with connections to Bornholm from the early 19th century to the present day. Special attention is given to the Bornholm school of painters which emerged at the beginning of the last century when a number of modernists, attracted to picturesque Bornholm and the tiny island of Christiansø, painted landscapes and local nature. The permanent exhibition includes works by Edvard Weie, Karl Isakson, Olaf Rude, Kræsten Iversen, Niels Lergaard and Oluf Høst. In addition, numerous paintings and works of sculpture present a rich picture of artistic life on Bornholm.

The building was constructed in 1993 and enlarged in 2003. Covering an area of some 4,000 square meters, the museum itself is an impressive architectural achievement. Designed by architects Fogh & Følner Arkitekter A/S, it is divided into three levels as the ground slopes down towards the sea. The galleries are situated on either side of a kind of street where water trickles down from the age-old Helligdomskilde healing spring.

== Gallery ==
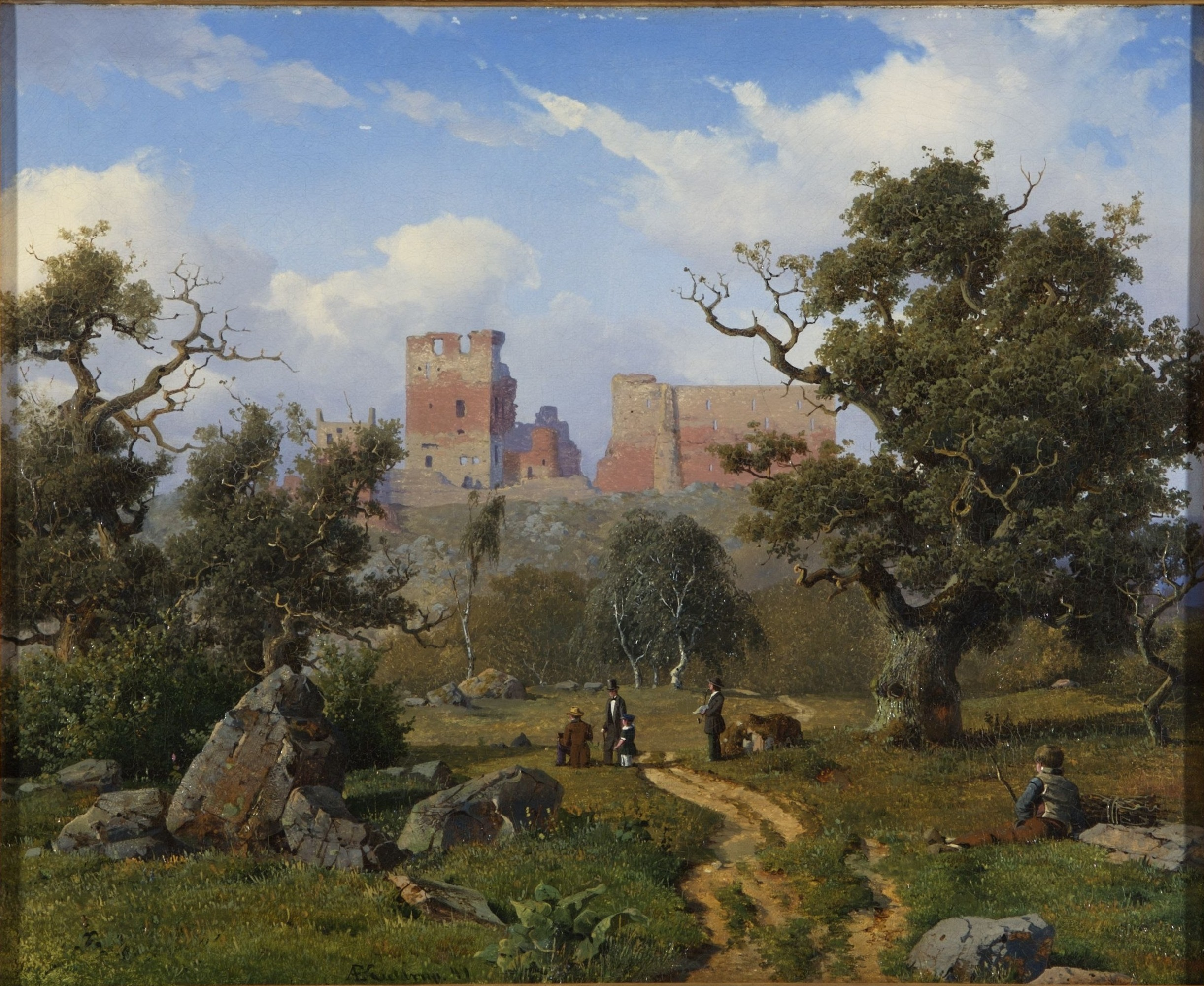
Anton Edvard

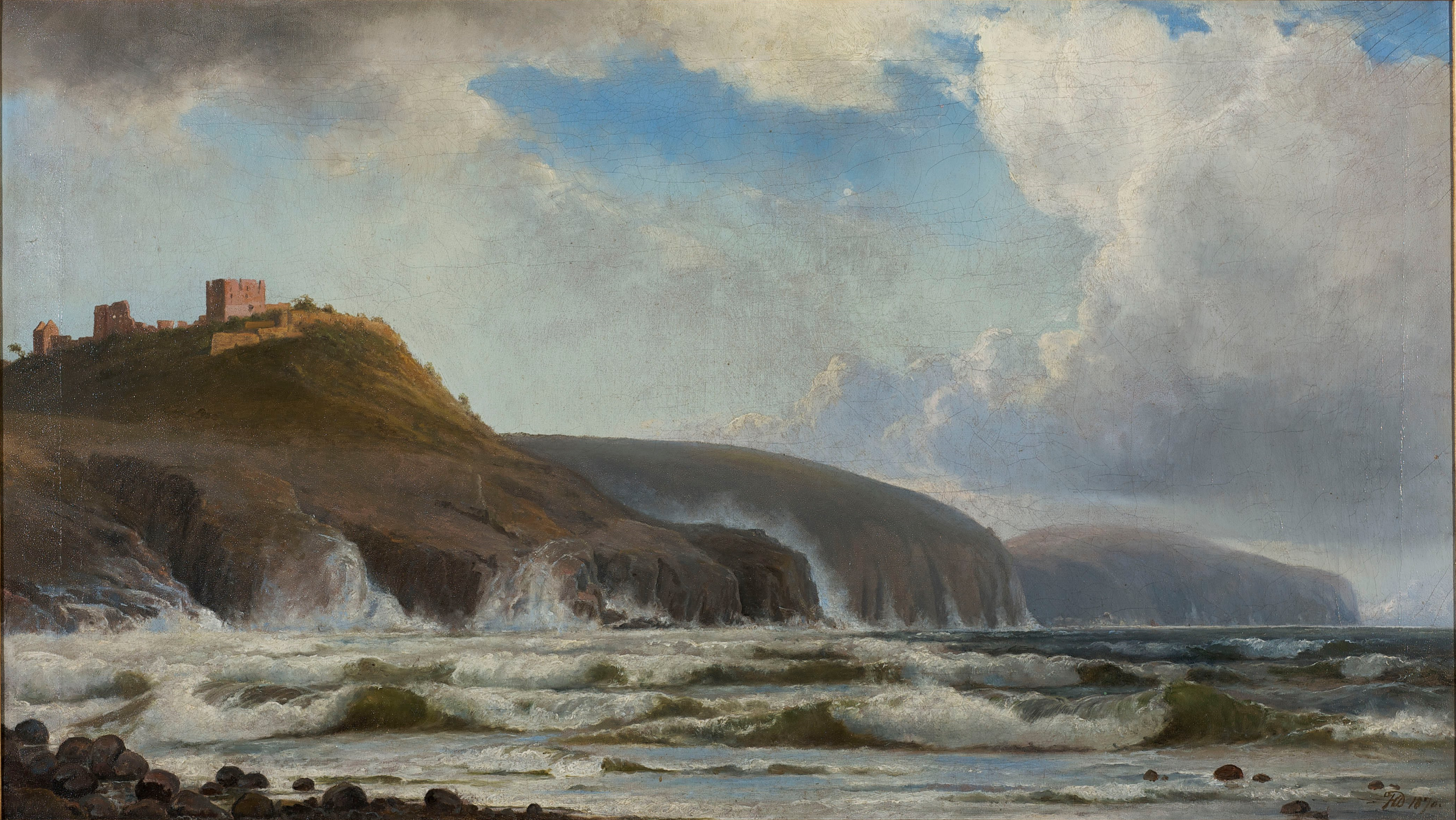
Holger Drachmann

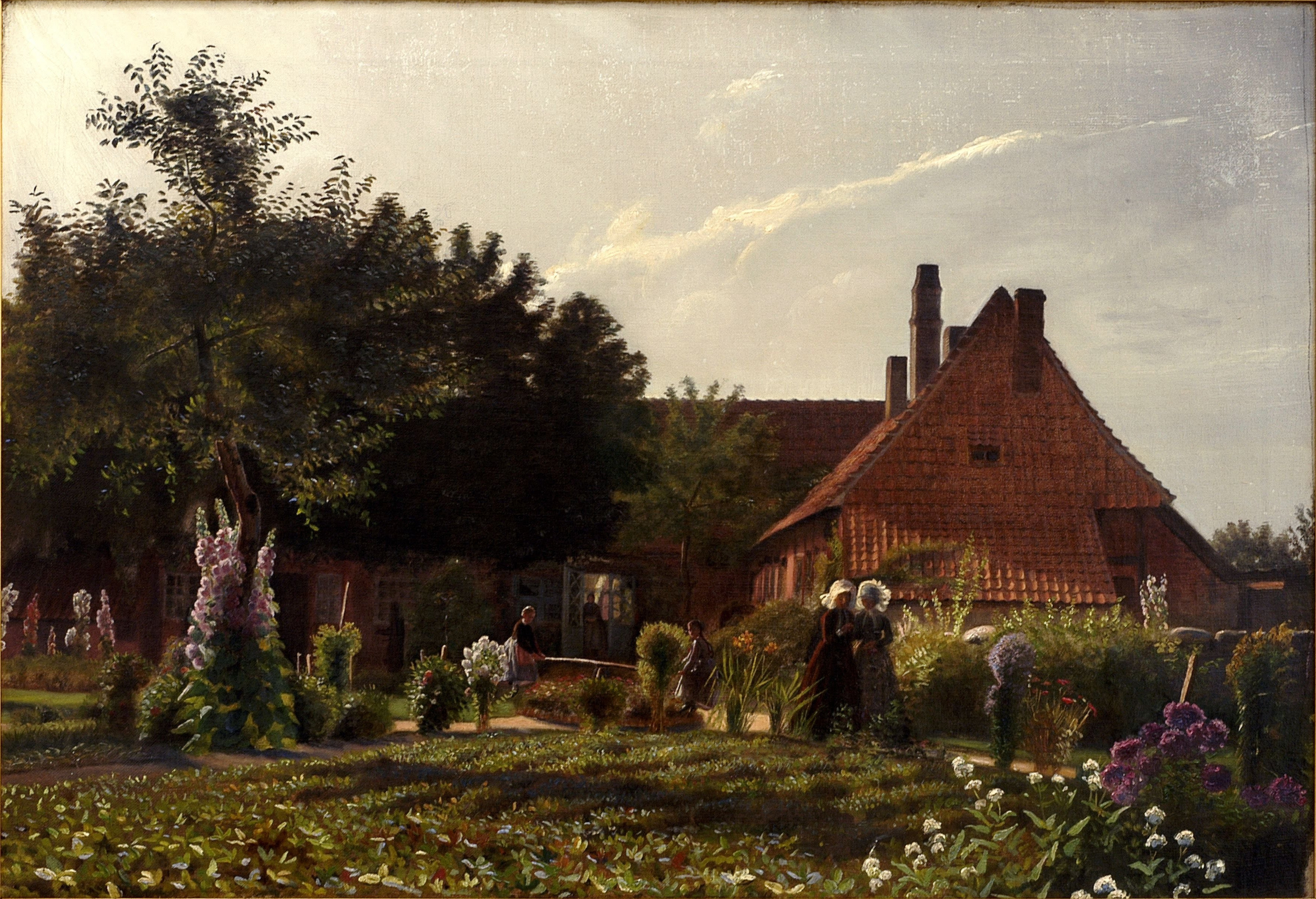
Kristian Zahrtmann

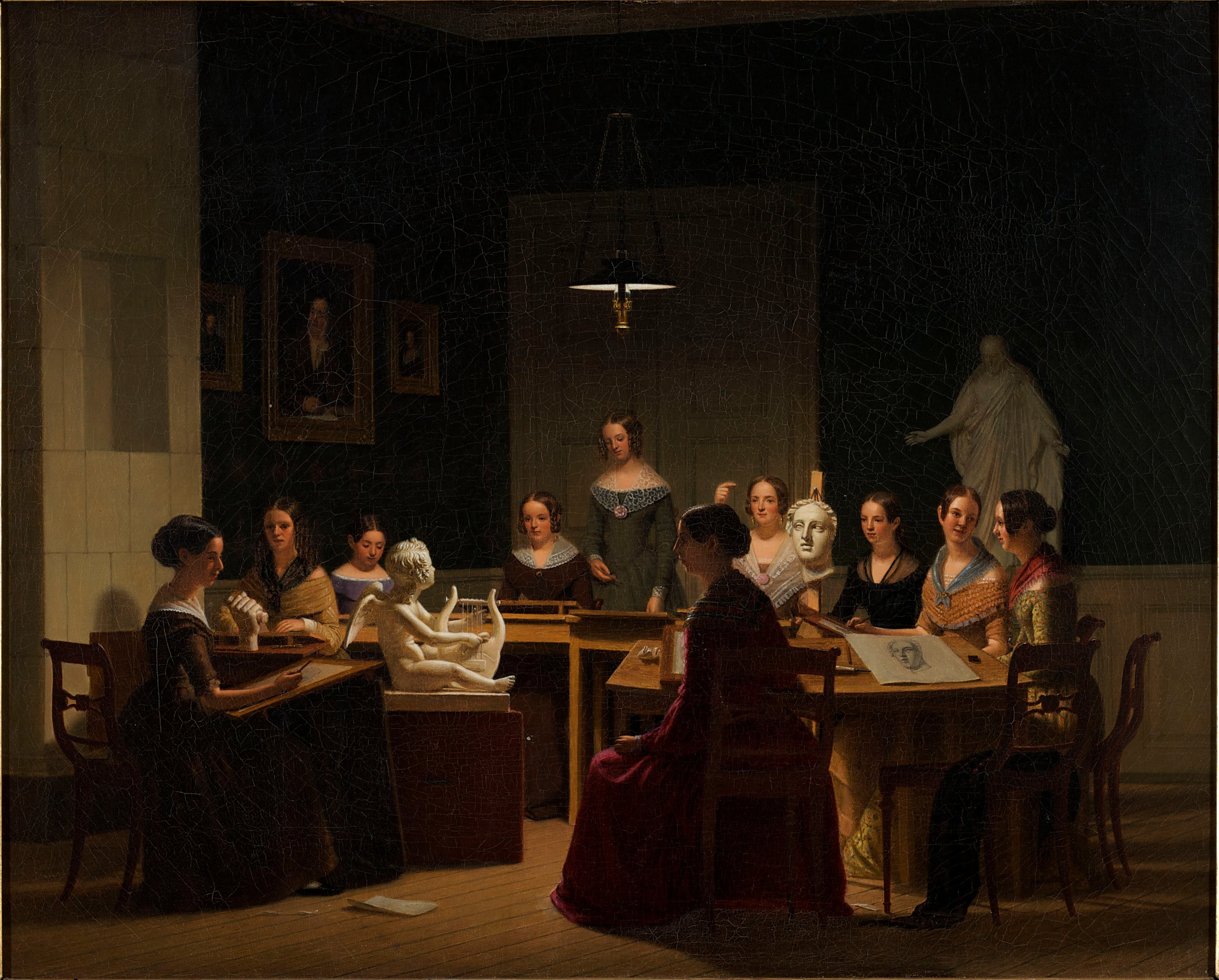
Lars Hansen

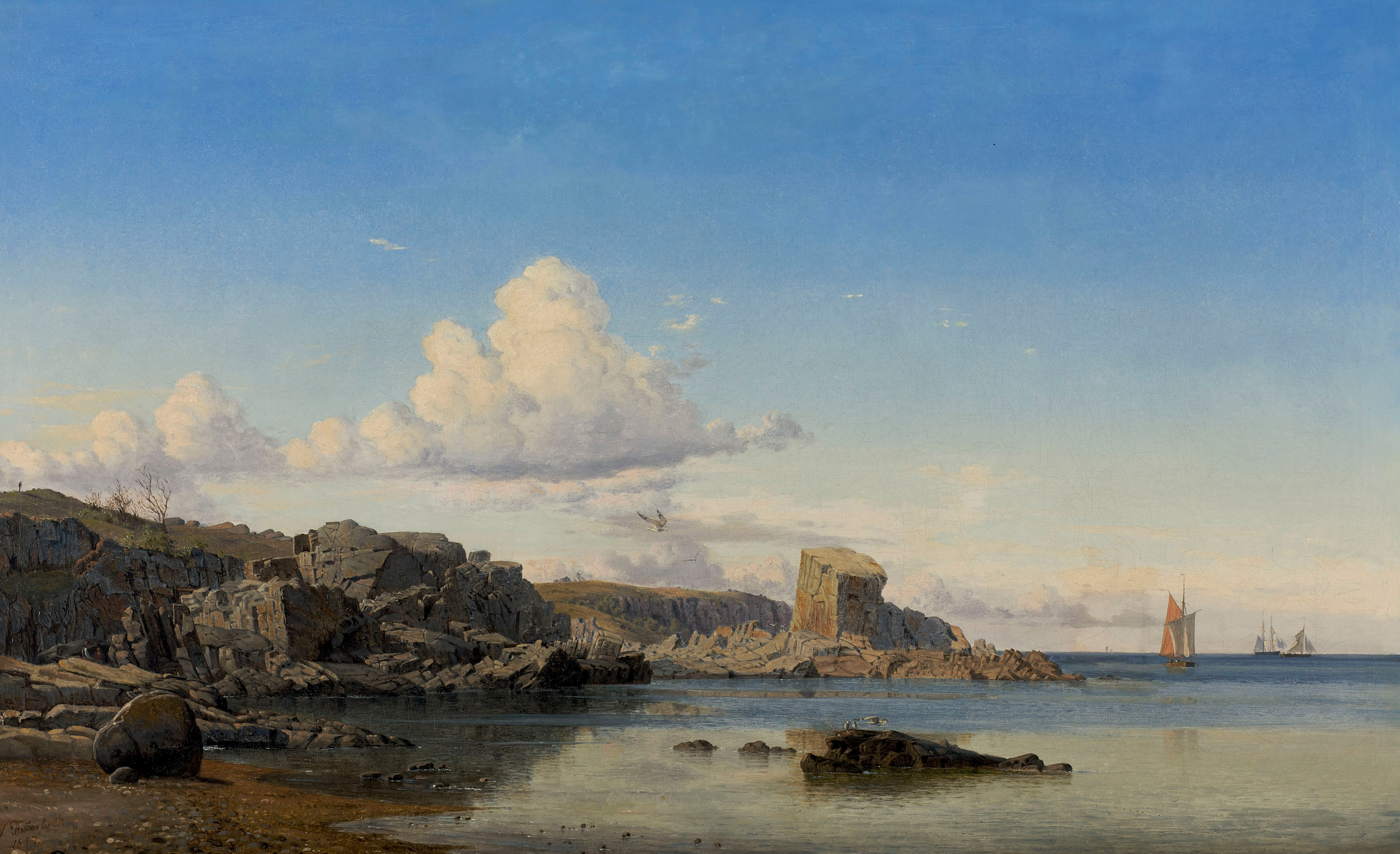
Viggo Fauerholdt
