= Bornholm school of painters =

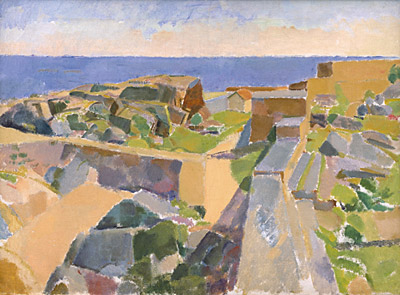
Bastions, Christiansø (1921) Karl Isakson

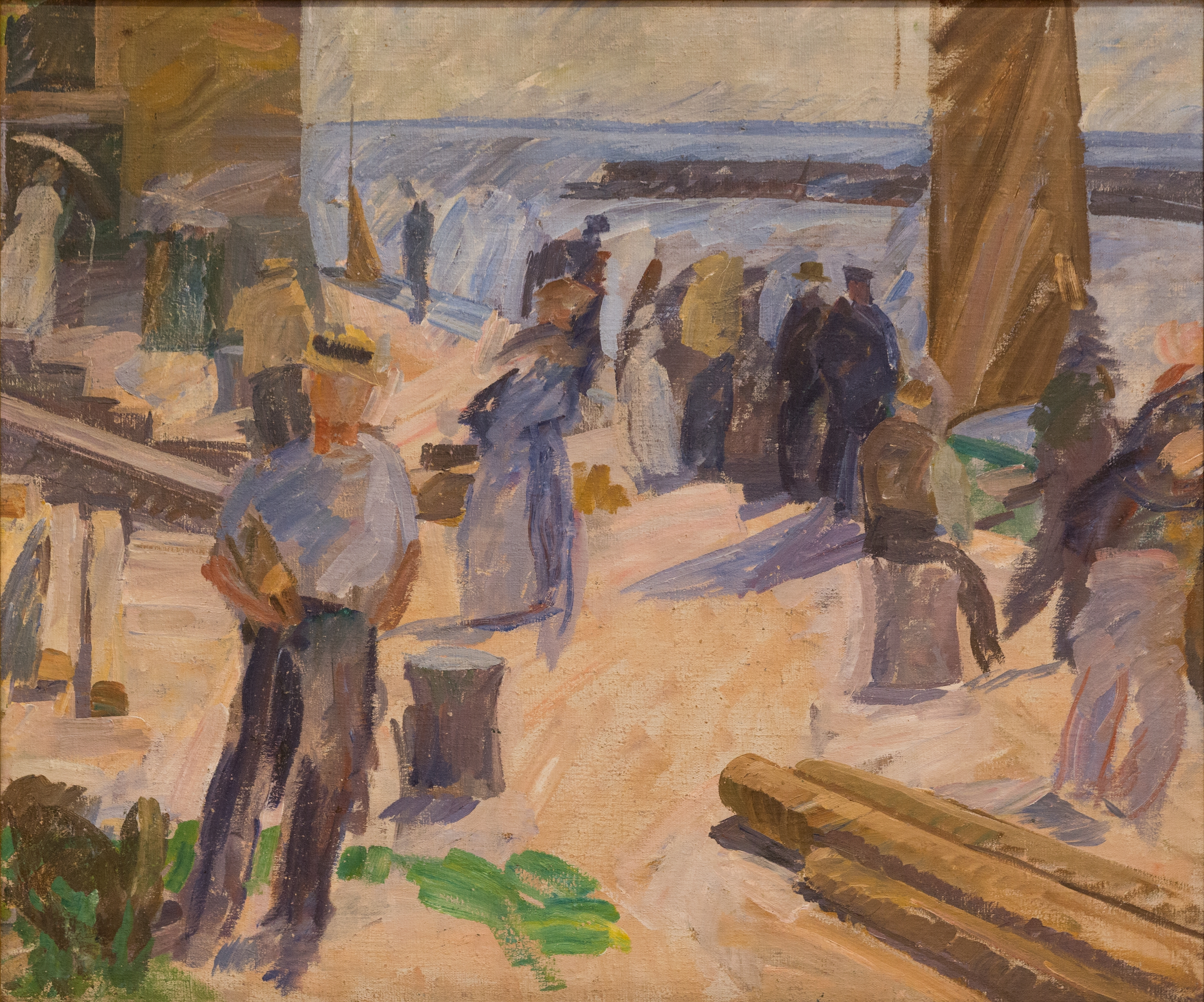
Postbåden kommer. Christiansø (1920) Edvard Weie

The Bornholm school of painters (Bornholmerskolen) started to take shape towards the beginning of the 20th century on the Danish island of Bornholm when a number of artists developed a distinctive style of classic modernism, inspired by the island's unique landscapes and light. It was not characterized by a uniform artistic line, but rather by its experiments with color, abstraction and cubism.

By the end of the 19th century, artists such as Otto Haslund had taken inspiration on the island. In the early 1900s, Karl Isakson (1878-1922) and Edvard Weie (1879-1943) were among those who were inspired by the island's constantly changing natural beauty, using pure, subdued colour to produce work in new aesthetic directions. They were soon joined by other Danish artists including Oluf Høst (1884-1966), Olaf Rude (1886-1957), Kræsten Iversen (1886-1955) and Niels Lergaard (1893-1982),

They lived mainly in the picturesque little ports of Gudhjem and Svaneke on the northern coast, adventuring at times over to the small island of Christiansø where they found further seclusion and inspiration.

Many of the works of the Bornholm School can be seen in the Bornholm Art Museum (Bornholms Kunstmuseum) near Gudhjem and in the Oluf Høst Museum at Gudhjem.

== See also ==
- Art of Denmark
- Skagen Painters
- Funen Painters

== Literature ==
- Fabritius, Elisabeth (2007). Danish Artists' Colonies: The Skagen Painters, the Funen Painters, the Bornholm Painters, the Odsherred Painters. Skagens Museum. ISBN 978-87-88686-39-5.
