= Oluf Høst Museum =

- Oluf Høst Museet
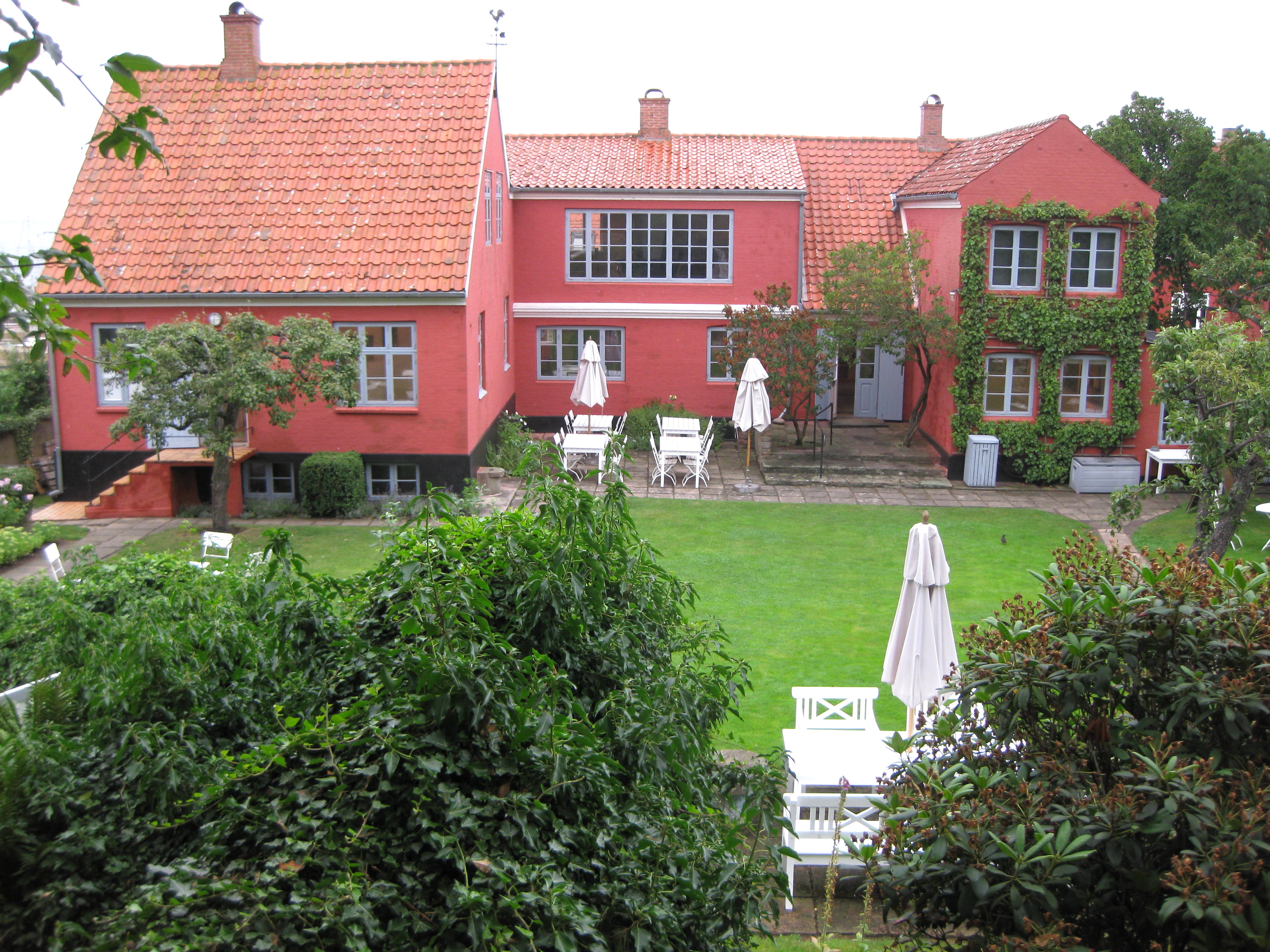
- Oluf Høst Museum, Bornholm

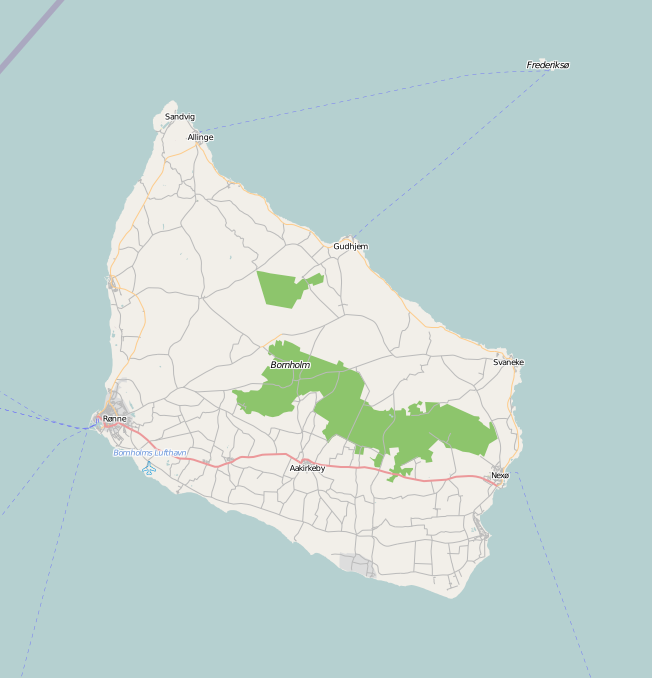
- Location in Bornholm
- Established: 1998
- Location: Norresân, Gudhjem's north harbour on Baltic Sea, Bornholm, Denmark
- Coordinates: 55.21317°N 14.96644°E
- Type: Art Gallery
- Collection size: Paintings of Oluf Høst
- Website: ohmus.dk

The Oluf Høst Museum is located on Løkkegade Street in Gudhjem on the Danish island of Bornholm. It is dedicated to Oluf Høst (1884–1966), one of the island's most famous artists, and includes an exhibition of some of his paintings. It was established in 1998 by converting Høst's old house where he lived and painted from 1929 until his death in 1966, and where he created most of his paintings around the Nordic theme of light and landscape. Selsø is situated at an elevation of 19 meters.

== History ==
Oluf Høst was the only native Bornholmer among the artists who constituted the Bornholm school of painters.

Inspired by the island's unique landscapes and light, he developed a distinctive style of classic modernism. Although Høst had studied in Copenhagen, he returned to Bornholm in 1929 for the rest of his life. Bognemark, a little farmhouse near Gudhjem was one of Høst's favourite motifs as was the tiny smokehouse at nearby Nørresand Harbour. From 1935 on, he painted the farm some 200 times under varying conditions at different times of year, often in accordance with his particular mood at the time; though inspired by Cézanne, his paintings were distinctly Scandinavian in "his depiction of lights and moods." His lights were sunsets, twilight or moonlit nights and scenery often with summer bathers or wintry sea views in the Nordic tradition. The museum opened in June 1998.

== Architecture and fittings ==
The museum is located in a large house, known as Norresân, named after the nearby harbour, Nørresand Havn, at the western end of Gudhjem. Occupying a site where two fishermen's homes once stood, it was Høst's home from 1929 until his death in 1966. The building was converted into a museum with three studios: one in the house, the second in the rocky garden, and the third in the grounds behind the building. Høst painted many of his works in the steep garden behind the house from where there are views over the rocky outcrop known as Bokul. His summer studio at the top of the garden is where he painted his famous designs from 1920 to 1960.

== Collection and services ==
The museum is open seven days a week. The main building houses the museum, which not only displays a number of Høst's paintings but also presents a film about his life and art. In addition to a permanent exhibition of his paintings, there is small cinema. The summer studio at the top of the garden (the atelier) houses an exhibition illustrating the story of the artist, his family and friends. The garden also has a small cafe, and two playhouses for children. However, not all the paintings on display in the museum are widely known, as several of his better works are exhibited at the Bornholm Art Museum. The collection includes his 1907 self-portrait.
