= Karl Isakson =

Swedish painter (1878–1922)

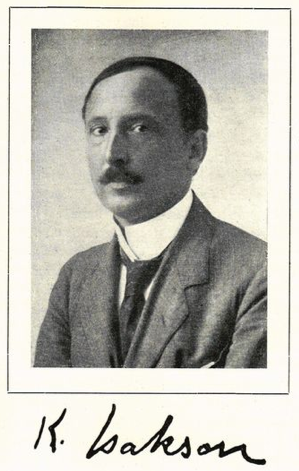
Karl Isakson (date unknown)

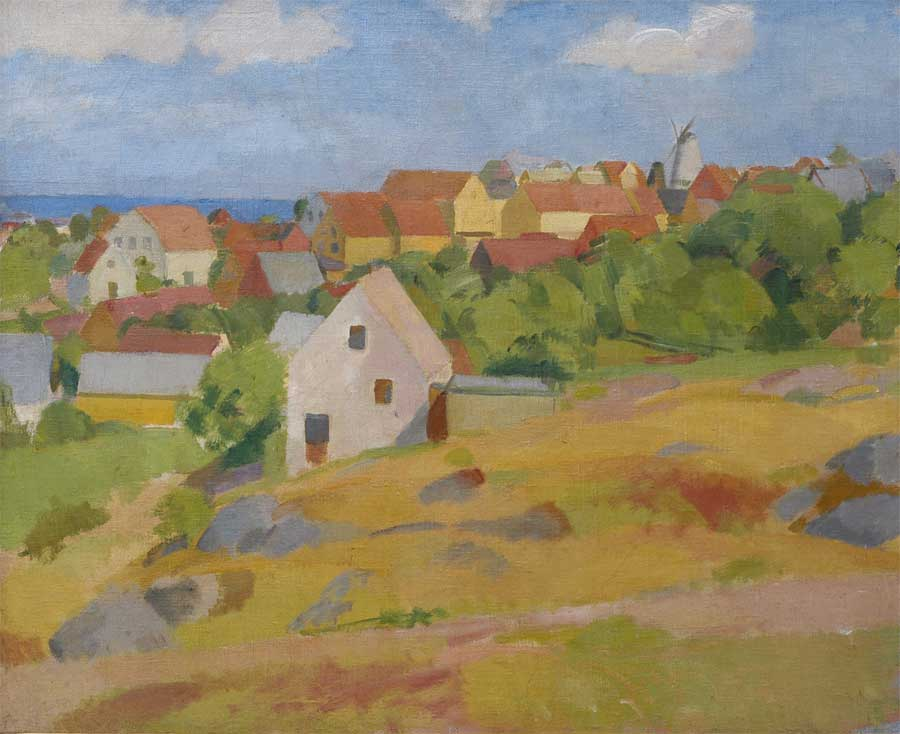
View of Gudhjem

Karl Oscar Isakson (16 January 1878, in Stockholm – 19 February 1922) was a Swedish painter who spent much of his professional life in Denmark where he is considered to be one of the fathers of Modernism. He had close associations with the Bornholm school of painters and made many paintings of Christiansø. He is cited as an artist who "sought to give their Biblical works a modern social and political context."

== Biography ==
Isakson was brought up in difficult circumstances in Stockholm. His father, blacksmith Karl Frederik, died when he was only eight months old, leaving his mother, Mathilda, to raise him and his sister Esther by running a laundry. At school he did so well he was known as the little professor. At home, in order to escape from the family misery, he began to draw, often surrounded by piles of laundry. He left school at the age of 13 to help out with the family finances by becoming a painter's assistant. When he was 15, on his own initiative he began taking evening classes in drawing at the Technical School. He also showed great interest in literature reading Swedish authors such as Viktor Rydberg and Wilhelm Ekelund and Danish works by Søren Kierkegaard and Hans Christian Andersen.

Before attending the Swedish Academy, Isakson worked as Carl Larsson's assistant, helping him with the frescos in the stairwell of the National Museum of Fine Arts in Stockholm. Larsson took a great interest in Isakson and encouraged him in his studies. In 1902, he travelled on a grant to Italy where he came into contact with Kristian Zahrtmann and his colony of Danish painters who introduced him to modern French trends, especially Paul Cézanne. He returned to Copenhagen with Zahrtmann where he attend his art classes, meeting many young artists associated with the beginning of Modernism in Danish painting. He developed an interest in what he called pure art, which like pure thought conveyed life's universal correspondences rather than the partial details of Realism and Naturalism. Like Carl Kylberg and Violet Tengberg, he believed art should have an existential or spiritual function, conveying a sense of higher transcendental values.

Thanks to his paintings of Christiansø, Isakson is considered to be one of the fathers of modern painting in Denmark. His landscape painting of Christiansø's Mindet (1911) shows how much he was influenced by Cézanne, both in his strong colouring and his use of parallel brush strokes.

== Artwork ==
Studying in Paris (1905–1907), Isakson was influenced by the great French colourists, such as Eugène Delacroix and Édouard Manet and symbolists, above all Gustave Moreau. But it was in 1911 that he underwent a transformation, influenced by Cézanne's colour and mathematical approach. He continued to paint landscapes, still lifes and interiors but with a greater attention to colour and form in an analytical Cubist style. Like the Neoimpressionists, he juxtaposed fields of colour to achieve maximum effect. He often worked with complementary colours such as a blue bowl with randomly placed oranges. Cézanne's ability to dispense with the unessential in order to achieve true synthesis provided a starting point for Isakson to become a Modernist.

After discovering Christiansø in 1911, Isakson spent much of his time painting the island's defences and landscapes. These became his favourite subjects, even though he continued to paint still lifes and models in a Copenhagen studio. After a spell in Paris (1914), where he studied under Henri Le Fauconnier and André Dunoyer de Segonzac, his work progressed from theoretical Cubism to a more Nordic style where his temperament and physical imbalance left their traces. When the military base of Christiansø was closed to foreigners during the First World War, Isakson suffered a nervous breakdown from which he never fully recovered. During the war years, he painted landscapes on Bornholm, for example Udsigt over Gudhjem (1921) while secretly working on a series of religious paintings focussing on death and resurrection.

During his lifetime, Isakson rarely exhibited his work. His paintings first attracted attention after a commemorative exhibition at Liljevalchs in Stockholm in 1922.

== Works in Danish museums ==
Kunstindeks Danmark provides an illustrated list of over 50 of Isakson's works in Danish museums. The largest collections are in Statens Museum for Kunst in Copenhagen and in Bornholms Kunstmuseum.

== Gallery ==
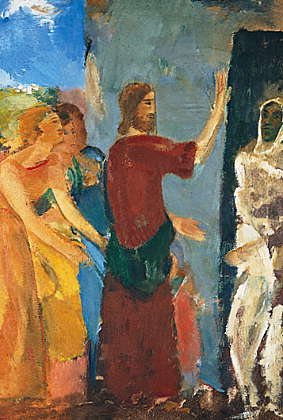
Resurrection of Lazarus (1921)

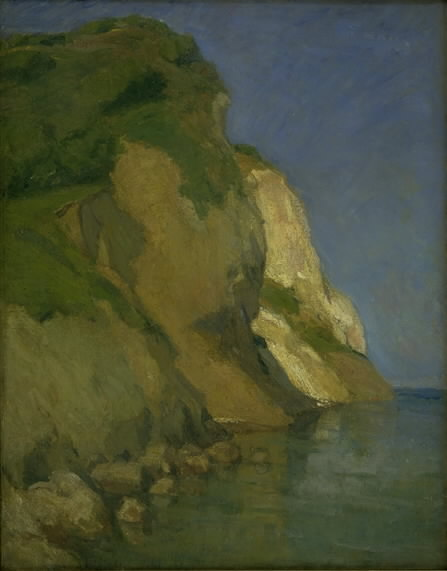
"From Møns Klint (1904)

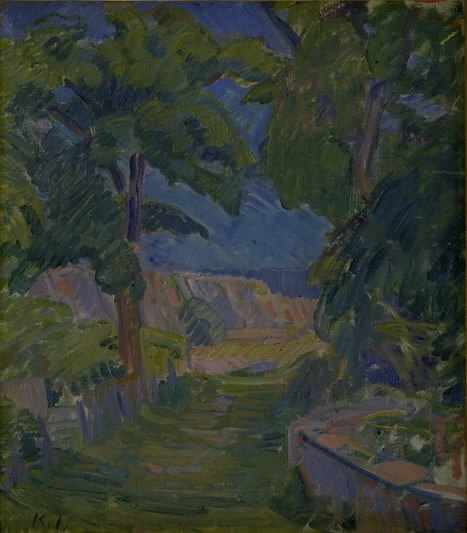
Memories, Christiansø (1911)

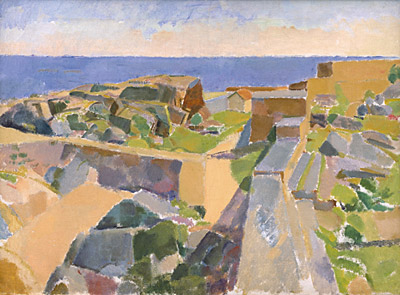
Bastions, Christiansø (1921)
