= Edvard Weie =

Danish painter (1879–1943)

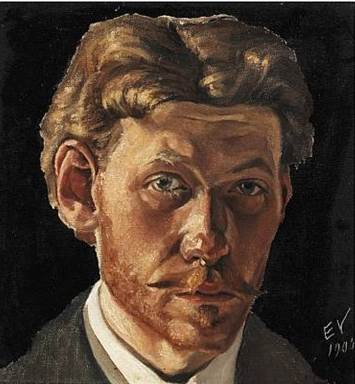
Self-portrait (1905)

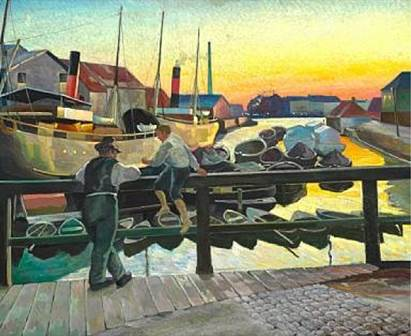
Boats at the Quay in Christianshavn

Viggo Thorvald Edvard Weie (18 November 1879 - 9 April 1943) was a Danish Modernist painter. He was a recipient of Eckersberg Medal in 1925. He died during 1943 in Frederiksberg.

== Biography ==
Weie was born in Copenhagen, Denmark. His father went away when Edvard was still very young and left his family in poverty. To help out, he would deliver newspapers every morning before school and later worked as a house painter. Despite the hardship, he was able to take art lessons. When he came of age, he went to Copenhagen to apply for admission to the Royal Danish Academy of Fine Arts, but was not accepted.

It was not until 1905, when he was already twenty-five years old, that he was able to enter the Kunstnernes Frie Studieskoler, operated by Kristian Zahrtmann (1843–1917). It was there that he was introduced to modern art. He became a favored student and accompanied Zahrtmann on a trip to Italy in 1907, but returned prematurely when they had a falling-out.

Back in Denmark, he painted a series of interiors and landscapes. From 1911 to 1920, he would spend part of every year painting on the island of Christiansø. It was there he met the Swedish painter Karl Isakson (1878–1922). After Isakson's early death in 1922, Weie made an extensive study of his uses of color, and applied what he learned to his own works.

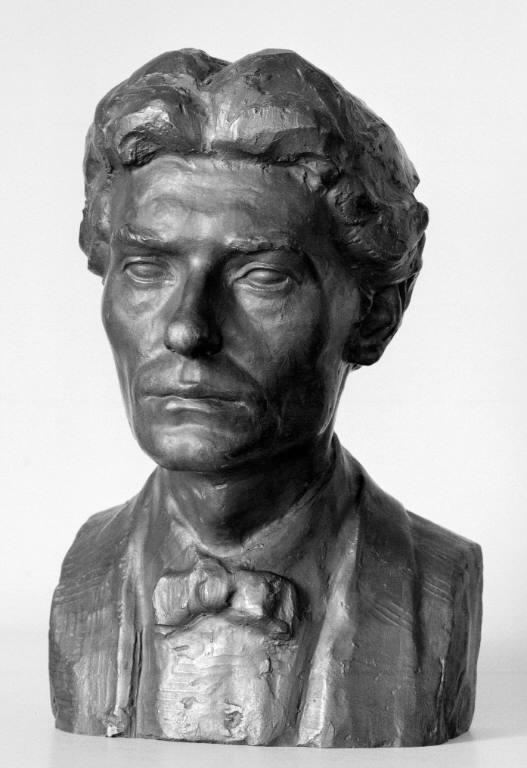
Portrait bust of Weie, 1908

He had begun by painting works with a mythological or literary basis, but later came to favor street scenes and views of Copenhagen harbor. He would often paint several versions of the same concept. Due to his intense self-criticism, many of these would end up in the fire. Over the years, his works became increasingly abstract.

He was awarded the Eckersberg Medal in 1925, but he was not a member of any artistic movement and contributed numerous harsh critical pieces to newspapers and magazines that served to isolate him from his peers. He felt that contemporary Danish art was in a crisis and lacked human values. In his later years, he rarely exhibited, but gave much of his time to writing a book that would clearly summarize his opinions. It was published posthumously, in 1951, by his widow, under the title Poesi og Kultur. He died during 1943 in Frederiksberg and was buried at Vestre Kirkegard in Copenhagen.

== Selected paintings ==
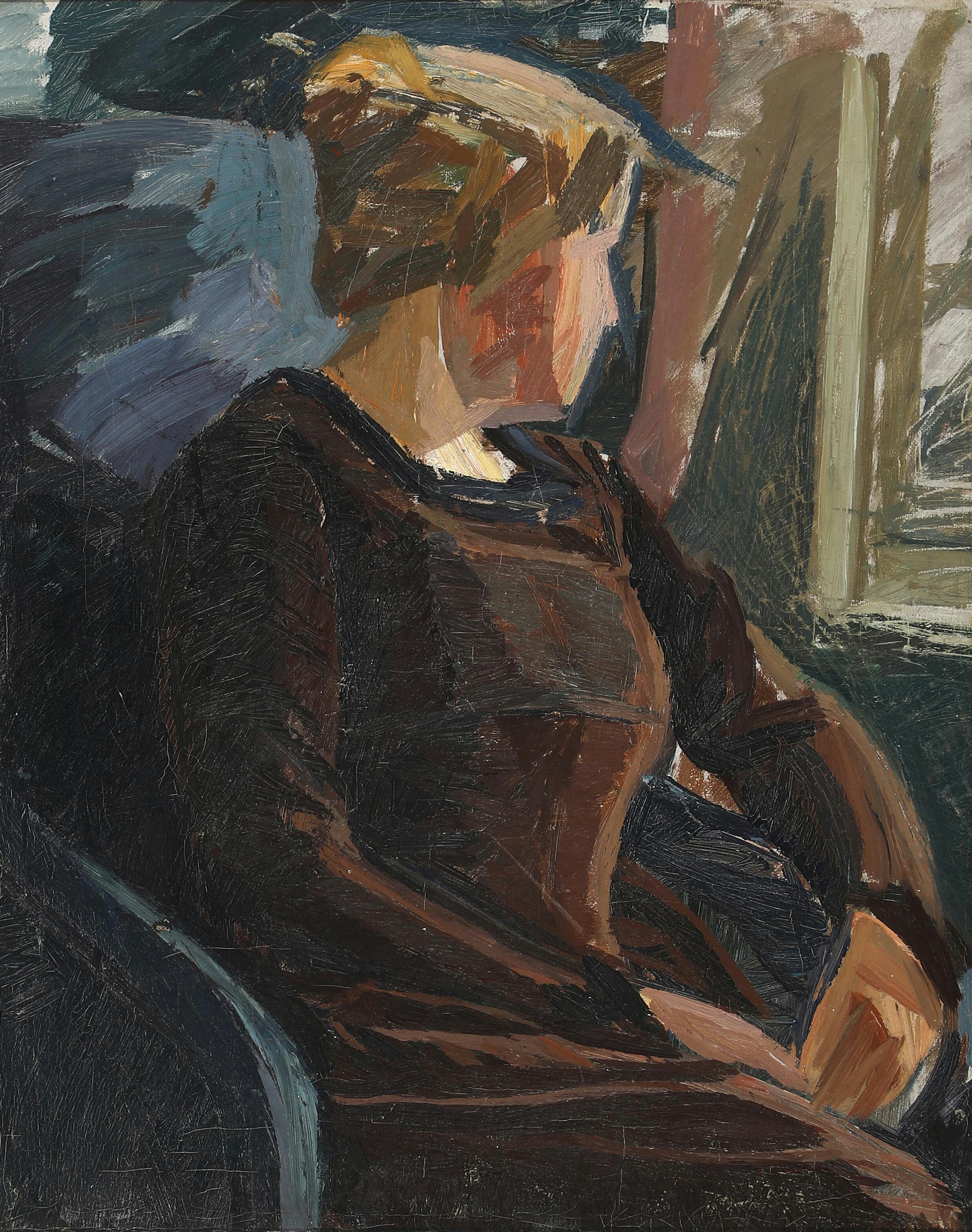
The Artists' Wife

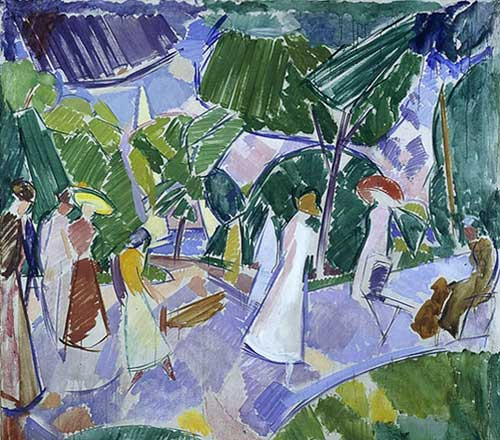
At Langelinie

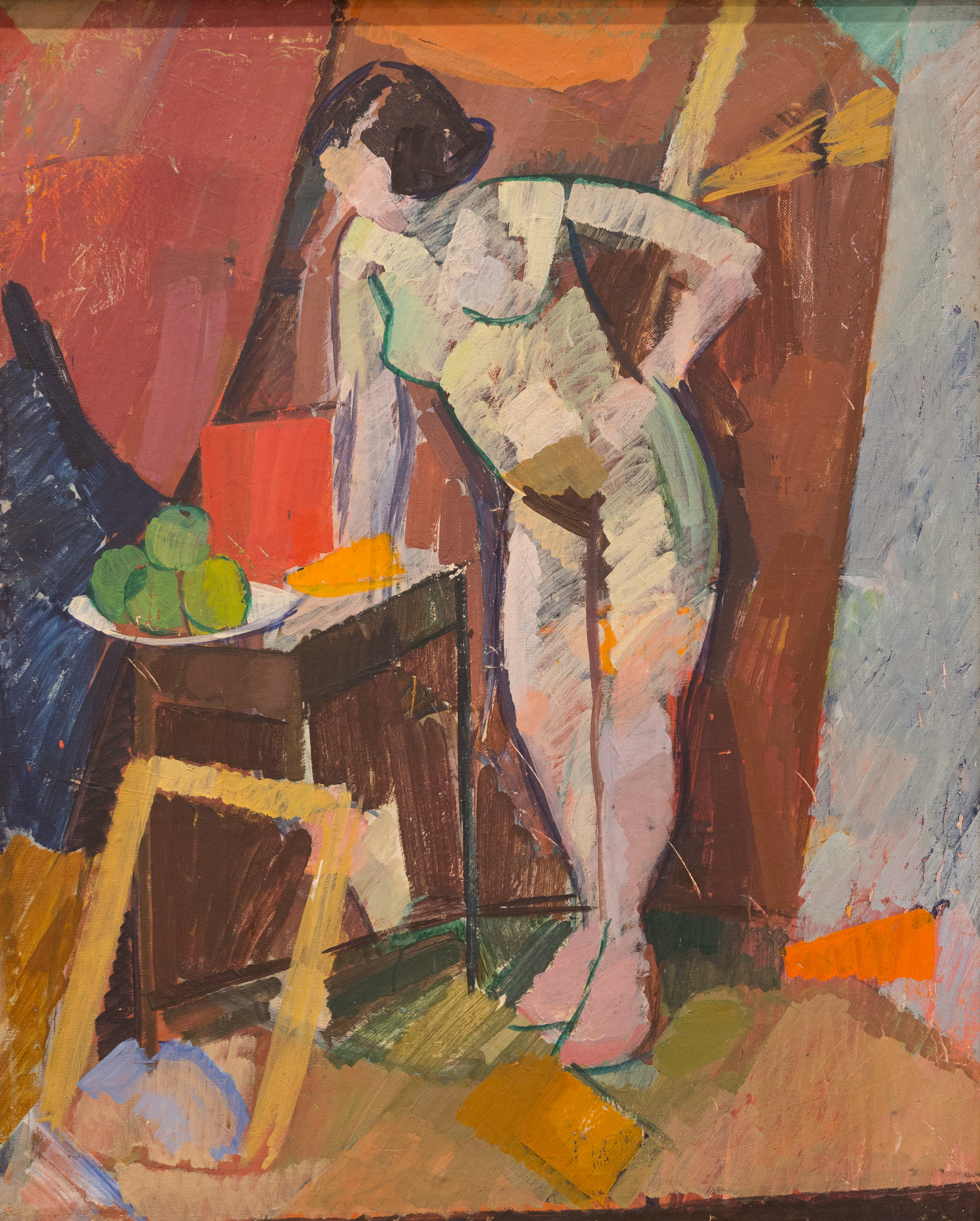
Female Model

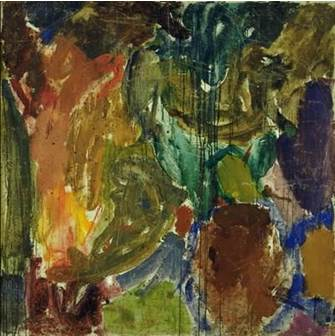
Dante and Virgil in the Underworld
