= Oluf Høst =

Danish artist (1884–1966)

Vinterdagen dør (The dying of a Wintersday), 1943. Depicting the setting sun through the entryway of Bognemark, Høst's farm in Gudhjem, Bornholm - one of his most frequent motifs.

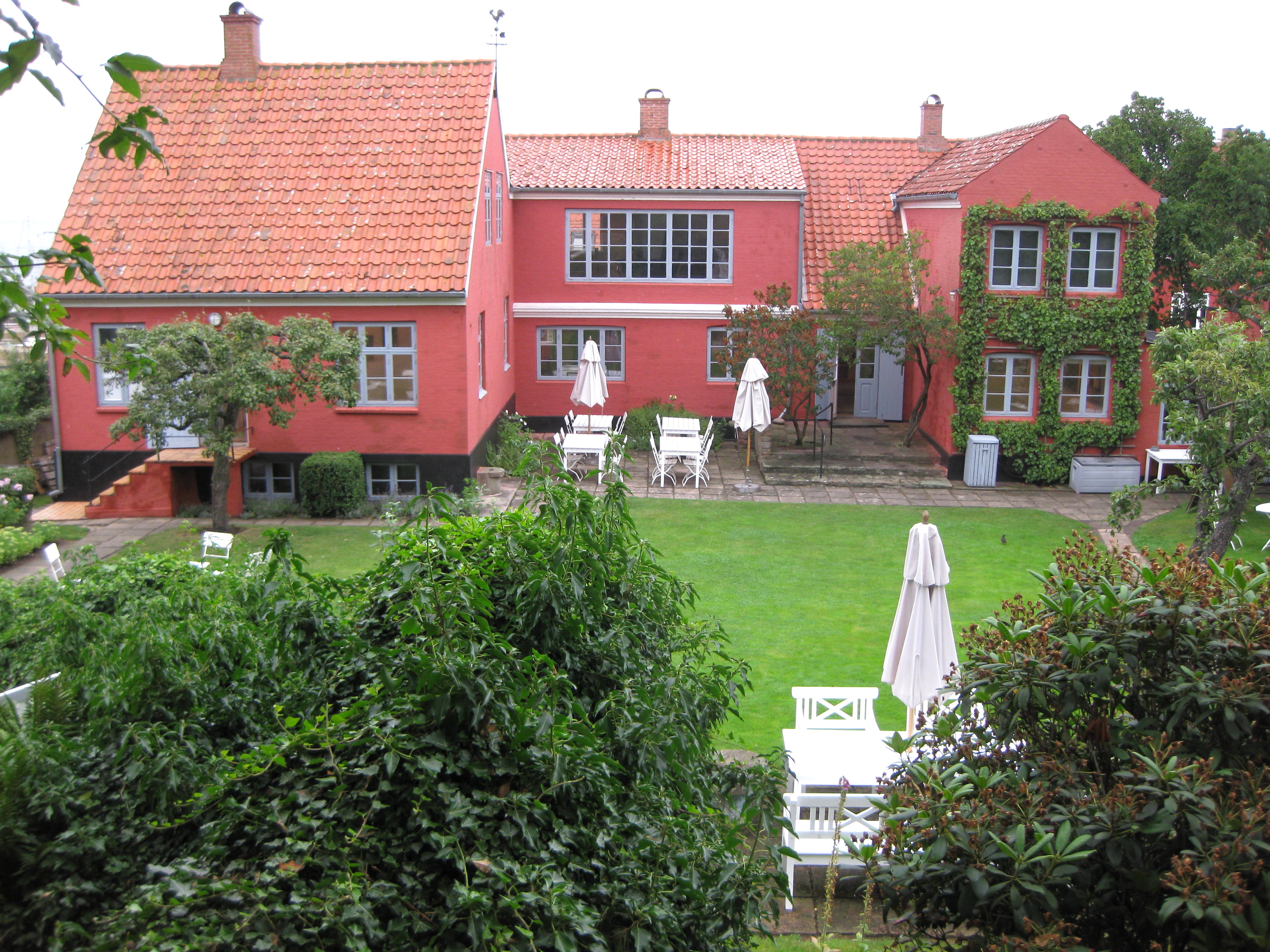
The Oluf Høst Museum in Gudhjem, Bornholm

Oluf Høst (18 March 1884 – 14 May 1966) was a Danish Expressionist painter, the only member of the Bornholm school who was a native Bornholmer. Although he studied in Copenhagen, he returned to the Danish island of Bornholm in 1929 where he remained with his family for the rest of his life. Bognemark, a little farmhouse near Gudhjem, was one of Høst's favourite motifs. From 1935 on, he painted the farm some 200 times under varying conditions at different times of the year, often reflecting his particular mood at the time. His home in Gudhjem, built from two fishermen's cottages with a rocky garden in the rear, is named "Norresân" after the nearby harbour, Nørresand Havn, where he painted many of his works.

== Life and work ==
Høst was born in Svaneke on the island of Bornholm. He attended various schools of art in Copenhagen including the Academy of Fine Arts from 1906 and 1915. During this period, he studied at Harald Giersing's school where Karl Isakson introduced him to Expressionism, especially through the work of Cézanne and Van Gogh. Inspired above all by Cézanne, Høst's work was also strongly influenced by the Nordic tradition as a result of the changing seasons and weather. This is evident in the way he depicted changes of light and mood. Høst commented:

We have our seasons, the long light nights, the enchantment that we must struggle with, while Cézanne lived in a place where there was no weather as such, as it was always the same.

In 1913, Høst married Hedvig Wiedemann, a fellow student. They had two sons, Ole and Niels. They were sociable hosts, inviting many contemporary intellectuals to their home, including the author Otto Gelsted (1888–1968) who was a frequent guest.

In 1943, Ole, the older of his two sons who had joined the SS, died in Barvinkove (Barwenkowo), a small town on the Eastern Front in Russia. Høst felt guilty for the rest of his life about introducing his son to his friend Fritz Waschnitius, an Austrian-born translator and writer who was a Nazi supporter. It was no doubt Waschnitius who had encouraged Ole to fight with the Germans. Over the next few years, Høst painted a series of pictures of the Bognemark farm as if it was facing towards Barwenkowo.

After Høst returned to Bornholm in 1929, he was free to paint as he wished. He concentrated on local buildings and landscapes including views of Gudhjem with its smokehouses (the little smokehouse at the Nørresand harbour was a favorite) and dramatic St. Hans midsummer bonfires. But his favorite was Bognemark, at the top of a cliff above Norresân, where he bought a farm in 1935, making it his second studio. From there, he painted many sunsets looking out across the water towards the Swedish coast. There were also picturesque views over Salene Bay where Sweden could be seen on a clear day. As the farmhouse is aligned in an east–west direction, it provided fine sunset vistas from the coach house. It was a frequent haunt for many years. He also painted details of the gables and roofs of the buildings in different shades of the light of the setting sun and in several permutations. There were scenes of the killing of pigs, the cowshed and the haystacks. He liked bright colors.

Høst is also known for his subtly expressed acerbic views in the 1,800 diaries he called "log books", written with such clarity and self-criticism. After his death, they were kept in secret by the Royal Library as Høst had specified they should not be revealed until 50 years after his death. A typical comment was: "I really have nothing to talk about with people who do not like negroes and films, and feel cement is ugly." or "I cannot do without the common people – nature's loneliness and silent friendship." Based largely on the log books, a recent biography by Jens Henrik Sandberg, director of the Oluf Høst Museum, was published in 2012 with the title Oluf Høst: jeg blev væk i mig selv (Oluf Høst: I was lost in my self), a title Høst had chosen for his biography if ever it should be written. His family and friends thought that the term of 50 years on the log books may have been set because they contained information about links with the Nazis but this proved not to be the case. In fact, one of Oluf Host's paintings was labeled by the Nazis as "degenerate art" and removed from an art exhibition in Berlin (along with a painting by Van Gogh).

Oluf claimed he was apolitical. On one occasion he confided that while he had voted conservative, he was in fact more sympathetic to the communists. Sandberg, qualifying him as a Metaphysical painter, comments that his early works were reflective of his association with the so-called "dark painters" but in later life they were of a lighter and more intellectual style.

== Honours ==
From 1930, Høst was recognized as a Danish artist of great repute. He received a number of honours, including the Eckersberg Medal (1933), Denmark's highest award for painting, and the Thorvaldsen Medal (1943), the prestigious visual arts award. In 1957 he was awarded the Prince Eugen Medal.

He also exhibited with success at Den Frie Udstilling (The Free Exhibition) from 1926. However, he was so attached to his paintings that he did not want to lose them and therefore did not exhibit for years on end. He was so fastidious about his paintings that even after their sale to private individuals or museums he would return with brushes and paints to touch them up, frequently reclaiming them for "completion". Many of his paintings, 50 in all, have indeed never been completed.

== See also ==
- Oluf Høst Museum

== Bibliography ==
- Bøggild, Hansaage: Høst: maleren og mennesket Oluf Høst, 2004, Copenhagen, Gyldendal, 240 pages. ISBN 9788702017465. (in Danish)
- Sandberg, Jens Henrik: Oluf Høst: jeg blev væk i mig selv, 2012, Copenhagen, Gyldendal, 280 pages. ISBN 9788702062274. (in Danish)
