= Christiansø Lighthouse =

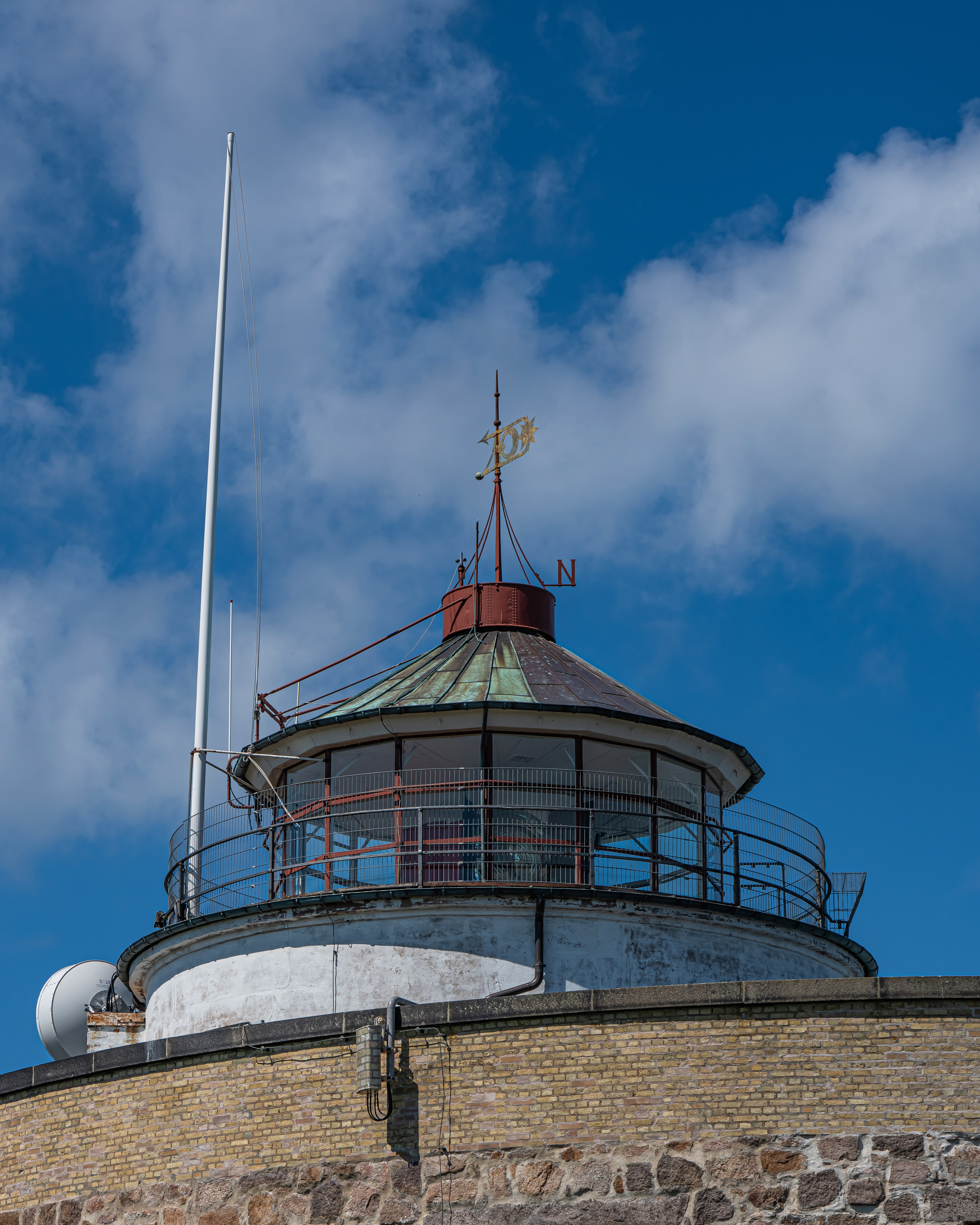
- Christiansø Lighthouse
- Location: Christiansø, Bornholm, Denmark
- Coordinates: 55°19′14.3″N 15°11′12.9″E

Tower
- Constructed: 1781
- Construction: stone
- Height: 16 metres (52 ft)
- Shape: cylindrical tower with balcony and lantern inside Store Tårn
- Markings: white tower and green roof lantern

Light
- First lit: 1805
- Focal height: 29 metres (95 ft)
- Range: 18 nmi (33 km; 21 mi)
- Characteristic: FI W 5 s.
- Denmark no.: DFL-6270

Christiansø Lighthouse (Danish: Christiansø Fyr) is located on the top of the Store Tårn tower on the Danish island of Christiansø, some 18 kilometres (11 mi) northeast of Bornholm in the Baltic Sea. Constructed and brought into service in 1805, it is one of Denmark's oldest.

== History ==
The lighthouse was designed by Poul de Løvenørn (1751–1826) in 1798. It was the first lighthouse in Denmark to have a flashing light, apparently inspired by the Swedish lighthouse at Marstrand, completed in 1781, the first in the world with a flashing light. In 1798, Løvenørn was authorized to go ahead with his project which consisted of building the lighthouse on the top of the existing tower known as Store Tårn. As a result of various delays, it was not until 1 October 1805 that the lighthouse with a height of 16 metres (52 ft) was brought into service.

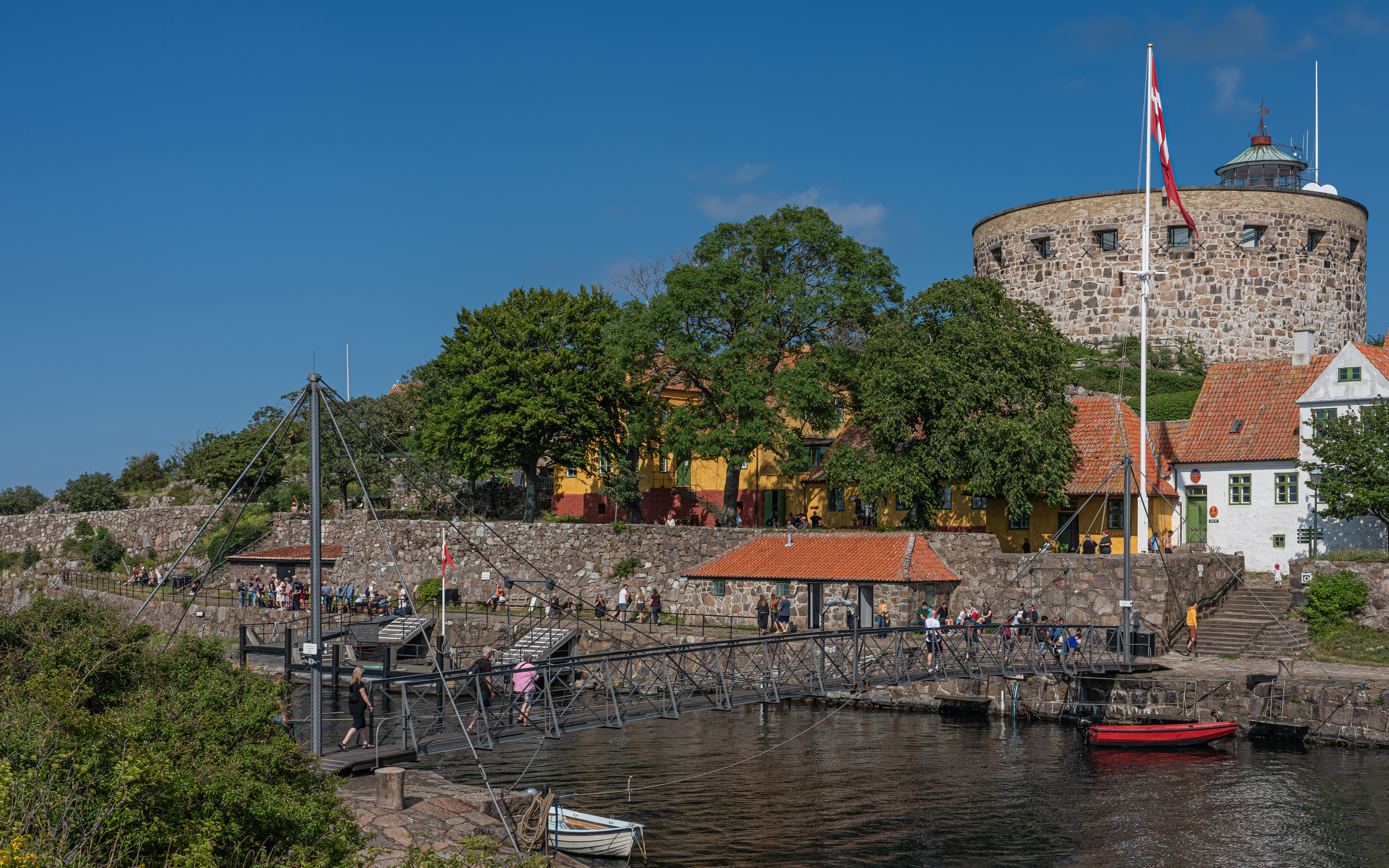
Christiansø Lighthouse from Frederiksø

== Technical details ==
The lighthouse consisted of nine parabolic gilded copper mirrors with a diameter of 4 ft, divided into three groups with a four-wick oil burner located in the focal point of each group. Each group was mounted on a horizontal wooden arm projecting from a vertical axel driven by clockwork. The lamps were rotated by clockwork adjusted so that there were three flashes a minute. The oil lamps remained in operation until 1879 when a lens system with a four-wick burner was introduced. In 1904, the burner was replaced by a paraffin lamp. In 1973, the Fresnel lens from the decommissioned Hyllekrog Lighthouse was installed.

== Structure ==
With a height of 16 metres (52 ft), the white-painted round tower with a greenish lantern and gallery stands on the top of the granite Store Tårn fortification. With a range of 18 nautical miles, the light flashes once every five seconds.

== See also ==
- List of lighthouses and lightvessels in Denmark
