= Niels Lergaard =

Danish painter

Niels Lergaard (10 February 1893-25 July 1982) was a Danish painter. He was a member of the Bornholm school of painters.

== Biography ==
Lergaard was born at Vorup in Randers, Denmark. He first trained at the Royal Danish Academy of Fine Arts in Copenhagen. He subsequently taught at the Royal Academy (1917–20). He spent a few years in Norway, where he lived until 1928 and where he became interested in Norwegian landscape painting.

In the late 1920s, he moved to the picturesque Danish island of Bornholm where he joined the art colony known at the Bornholm school of painters (Bornholmerskolen). His paintings displayed the careful construction that characterized his work, for example in his landscapes of Gudhjem. He painted the sea, with a high horizon, the coast, figures with precisely constructed silhouettes, or Bornholm’s steep cliffs.

In the 1940s his art moved towards ever-increasing simplification. With strong violet and purple colors that dominate. The dark colours he used in the 1930s were gradually replaced by a lighter palette. He worked to release new expressive possibilities from oil colours and in this way further emphasized the luminous power and depth of the picture plane. Thus his landscapes display a deeply symbolic, transcendent power. From 1959 to 1964, Lergaard was a professor at the Royal Academy. In 1965 he received the Eckersberg Medal.

== See also ==
- Art of Denmark
- Bornholm school of painters
