= Christiansø Church =

Church building on the island of Christiansø, Denmark

Coordinates: 55°19′17″N 15°11′13″E

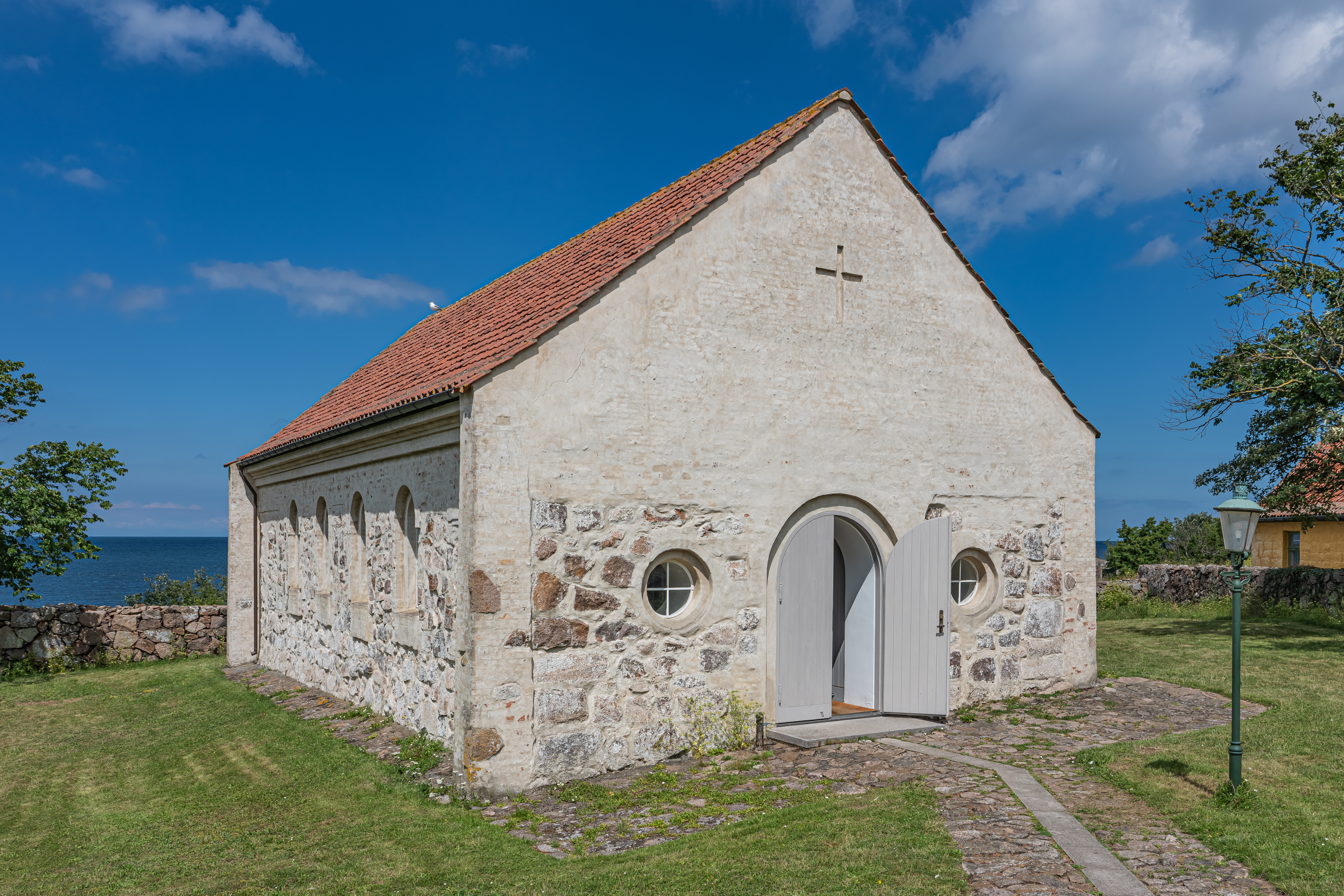
Christiansø Church

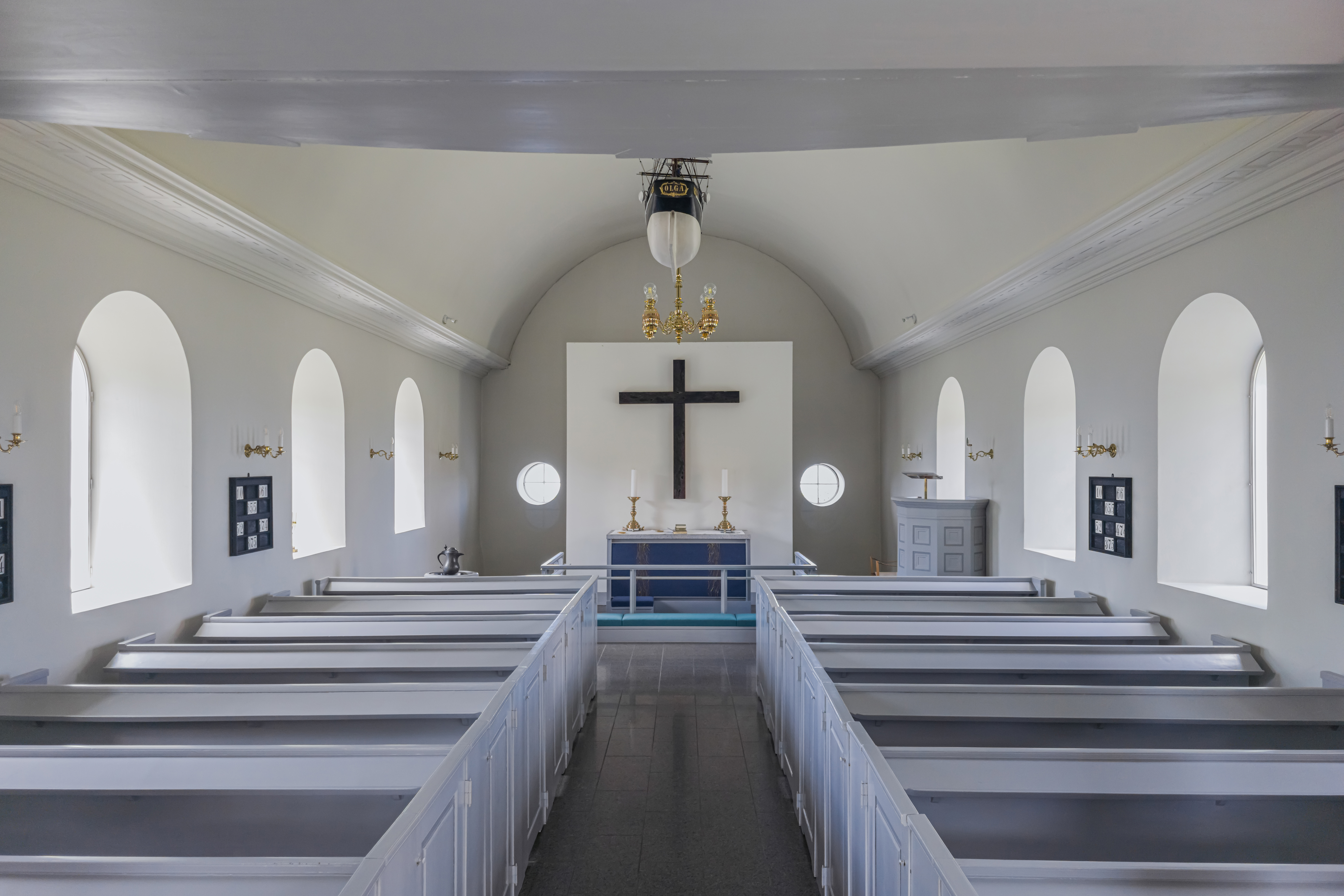
Interior view

Christiansø Church is a church on the Danish island of Christiansø, some 18 km (11 mi) to the north-east of Bornholm. It was initially the church for the garrison stationed in the island's fortifications.

== History ==
The church was first consecrated in 1685 when the island's fortifications were completed. Serving the garrison, it was in a small ground-floor room in the fortification tower, where it was used until 1821. It was then moved some two hundred metres (660 ft) to the east to its present location on an irregular quadrangular plot surrounded by fieldstone walls. The small rectangular granite building was rebuilt and enlarged in 1852, with a porch added on the western side. Comprehensive restoration work was undertaken in 1928 under architect Christian Olrik. The main entrance was widened, and a gallery was added inside. The four straight-sided windows on either side of the nave were slightly reduced in size and given a rounded finish. The ceiling consists of a plastered, wooden barrel vault.

In the south-west corner of the churchyard there is a free-standing bell tower with two bells. Typical of the Bornholm style, it consists of a fieldstone base and a half-timbered belfry.

== See also ==
- List of churches on Bornholm
