= Kræsten Iversen =

Danish artist

Kristen "Kræsten" Iversen (Danish pronunciation: [ˈiˀvɐsn̩], 26 January 1886 - 9 August 1955) was a Danish artist who is remembered both for his paintings and his painted glass windows. He was a member of the Bornholm school of painters and a professor at the Royal Danish Academy of Fine Arts.

== Biography ==
Iversen was born in the parish of Holsted in Vejen Municipality, Denmark. He was the son of Niels Laurids Pedersen (1848–1902) and Grethe Hansen (1851–1910). Between 1904 and 1905, He trained at the Copenhagen Technical College. He exhibited several time during 1910–1918 at the Artists' Autumn Exhibition. In 1919, he exhibited four works at the Charlottenborg Spring Exhibition. In 1920, he visited Bornholm for the first time where the natural colours and distinctive light influenced his landscapes .

Between 1927 and 1931, he performed the large painted ceiling decoration in the Great Hall at Christiansborg Palace. His first work with glass was for stained glass windows at Risskov Church. Iversen also designed the window in the North Chapel at Fårevejle Church. He went on to decorate the windows of the Danish church in Buenos Aires. He decorated a number of other buildings including Christiansborg, the city hall in Aarhus and the windows of Sankt Nicolai Church in Svendborg.

Iversen was exceptionally diversified in his art work which covered oils, frescos, watercolours, mosaics and glass painting. He was awarded the Eckersberg Medal in 1923. He became a knight of the Order of the Dannebrog in 1932. He was professor at the Royal Danish Academy of Fine Arts from 1930 until his death and served director of the Academy 1949–1952. He died during 1955 in Copenhagen.
