= Ertholmene =

Archipelago in the Baltic Sea

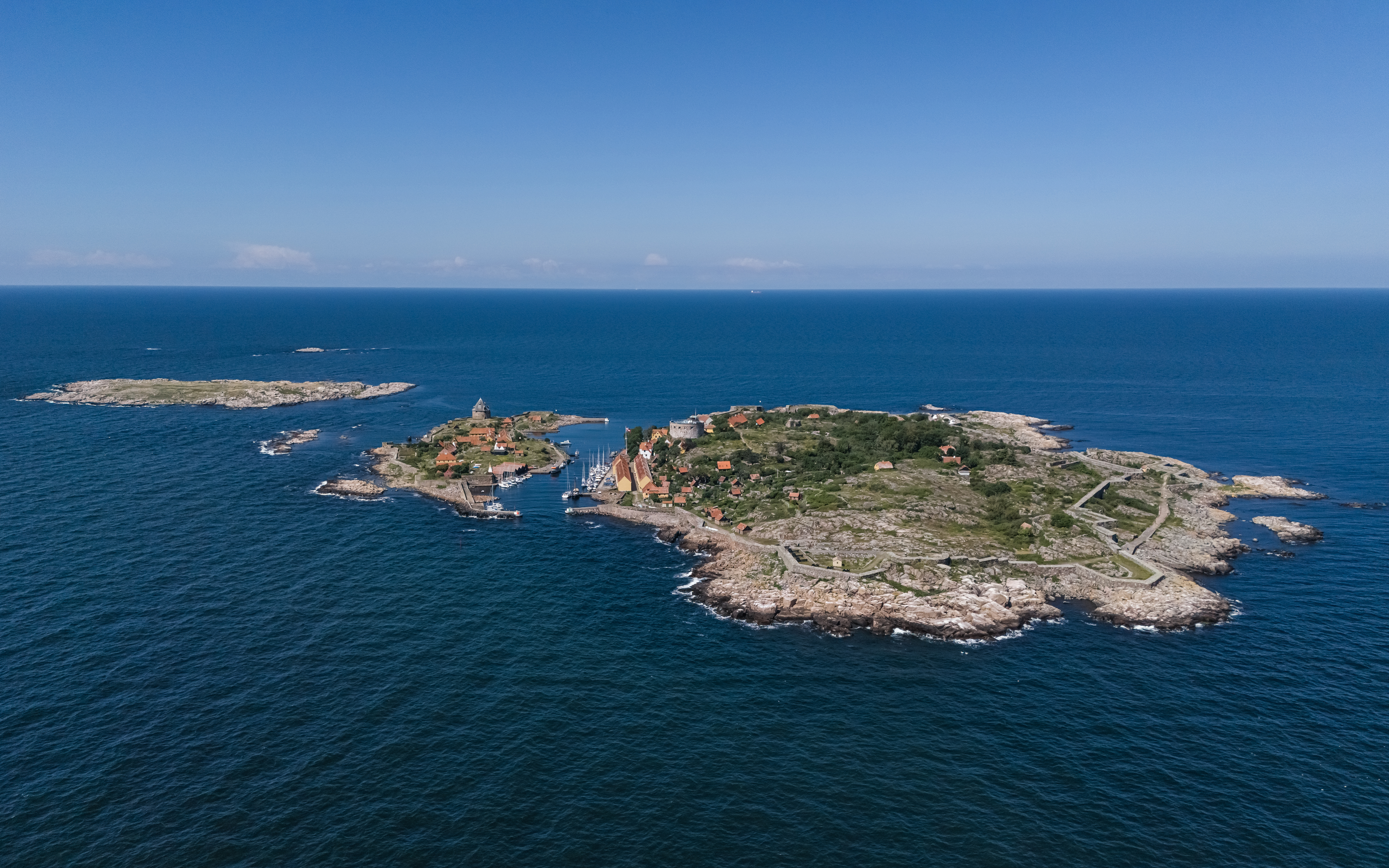
- Aerial view of Ertholmene, main islands

- Location of Ertholmene in Denmark

Geography
- Location: Baltic Sea
- Coordinates: 55°19′12″N 15°11′16″E

Administration
- Denmark

Fæstningen Christiansø
- Northeast of Bornholm, Denmark
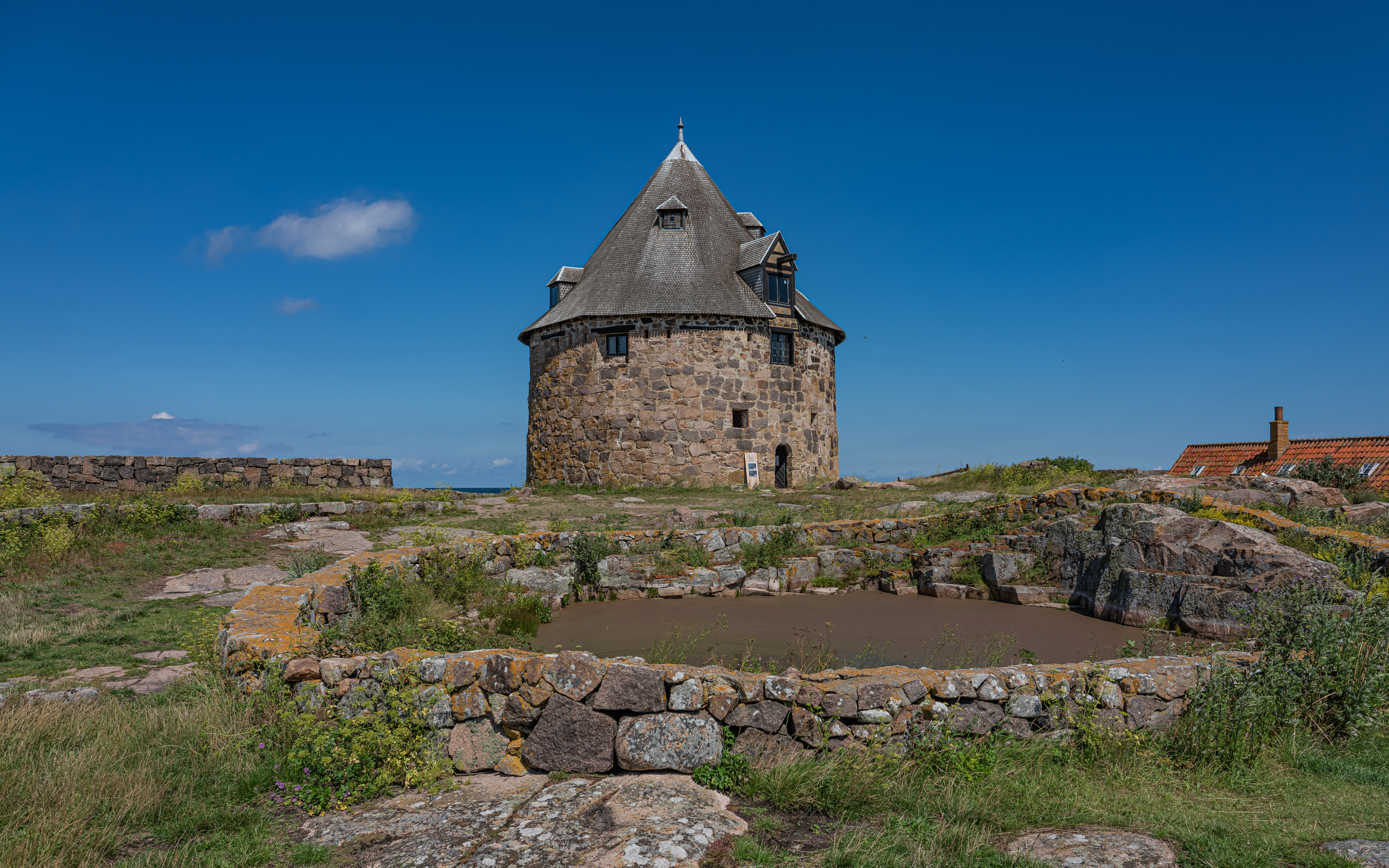
- Lille Tårn ("Little Tower") on Frederiksø

Site information
- Type: Naval fortress
- Controlled by: Denmark

Site history
- Built: 1684
- In use: 1684–1855 (1863)
- Battles/wars: Gunboat War

Designations

Ramsar Wetland
- Official name: Ertholmene
- Designated: 9 February 1977
- Reference no.: 165

Ertholmene (formerly spelled Ærtholmene) is a small archipelago in Denmark. The largest island is Christiansø, whose name is often used with reference to the entire archipelago. Ertholmene are situated 18 kilometres (11 mi) northeast of Gudhjem, Bornholm, and include Denmark's easternmost point. Two of the islands, Christiansø and Frederiksø, are inhabited, with a combined permanent population (as of 2024) of 90. The archipelago has a total area of 39 hectares (96 acres). Its name is derived from the Danish for "pea islands".

Historically an important navy location, the fortress closed in 1855. Since then there has been no operable military infrastructure on the archipelago, but it remains under the formal administration of the Ministry of Defence, which employs 25 to 30 people for maintaining the islands' civilian infrastructure, museum and historical buildings. Today the economy of Ertholmene is almost entirely based on tourism, with tens of thousands of visitors each year, the majority on day-trips from Bornholm during the summer months. The archipelago's buildings and nature are protected by law, and access to the uninhabited islands is restricted.

== Islands ==
Ertholmene consists of three main islands, Christiansø, Frederiksø and Græsholm, plus a number of rocks and skerries. The inhabited islands of Christiansø and Frederiksø are accessible to visitors, but the remaining are only accessible to people with special permission.

- Christiansø, named after King Christian V, has an area of 22.3 hectares (55 acres); it is the largest island in the archipelago. It is home to Christiansø Church and Christiansø Lighthouse. The highest point of Ertholmene is Møllebakken on Christiansø, 22 m (72 ft) above sea level.
- Frederiksø, named after King Frederick IV, has an area of 4 hectares (9.9 acres). It is the only other inhabited island besides Christiansø. It is located just west of Christiansø, and connected to it via a 30-metre (98 ft) swing bridge for pedestrians. The sound between Christiansø and Frederiksø is a well-sheltered natural harbour. Frederiksø is home to Christiansø Museum, which is situated inside Lille Tårn ("Little Tower").
- Græsholm has an area of 11 hectares (27 acres) and is located 250 m (820 ft) northwest of Frederiksø. It is uninhabited and serves as a bird reserve, with large breeding colonies of common eider, red-breasted merganser, gulls, common murre and razorbill. These murre and razorbill colonies used to be the only in Denmark, but in recent decades smaller numbers began breeding at Hammeren on Bornholm (very large numbers winter in Danish seas).
- Østerskær is a skerry located 300 m (980 ft) east of Christiansø. It is the easternmost point of Denmark, at 15° 11' 55" E longitude.
- Tat is a skerry located 1.1 km (0.7 mi) northwest of Christiansø and Frederiksø. It is 100 m (330 ft) long and 75 m (246 ft) wide, and surrounded by a number of smaller skerries. It contains a lighthouse, and serves as a bird reserve. Ertholmene is home to a large population of grey seals and it is not unusual for hundreds to rest on Tat.

== History ==
Fishermen from Bornholm have used Ertholmene for temporary shelter since the Middle Ages. The first permanent settlement was the result of the Danish-Swedish conflicts in the late 17th century. As Denmark needed a naval base in the central Baltic Sea, a fortress was built on Christiansø and Frederiksø in 1684 which served as an outpost for the Danish Navy until 1855. Christiansø Church originally served the garrison. The population peaked at the census in 1810 which showed 829 inhabitants. They were soldiers and were there because of the Gunboat War.

Many of the historical buildings now serve as living quarters for the local population, and some are rented, year after year, to regular summer residents. The islands' external appearance has changed very little in over 300 years. Girdled by thick granite walls with old cannons pointed seaward, Christiansø is a picturesque tourist spot seemingly frozen in time. A former part of the fortress, Store Tårn has housed the Christiansø Lighthouse for the past 200 years, and a small round tower on Frederiksø, Lille Tårn, serves as a museum.

== Notable people ==
- Ernst Wilhelm Stibolt (born 1741 in Christiansø – 1796) a Danish naval officer and ship builder; his father, (naval) Commander Caspar Henrik Stibolt, was Commandant of Christiansø for many years.

== Demography and administrative status ==
Together with Bornholm, Ertholmene is part of Landsdel Bornholm. Ertholmene makes up the Parish of Christiansø in the Church of Denmark and is served by Christiansø Church. On 1 January 2017 out of 78 inhabitants in total there were 69 members of the Church of Denmark (88.46% of the population). Ertholmene has never been part of a municipality, county, or region.

The islands form an unincorporated area that does not belong to either a municipality or a region. Instead they are state property governed by an administrator, appointed by the Danish Ministry of Defence, with the responsibility being the tasks normally performed by municipalities and other public sector civil services.

== Economy ==
The major sources of income in Ertholmene is tourism. There are about 45,000 visitors per year, mostly day visitors arriving via Bornholm during the summer months. Ertholmene is also a popular destination for yachting. Fishing used to be the main source of income, but today there are no commercial fishers on the islands.

=== Taxation ===
The islanders, who do not pay municipal taxes of any kind and were never part of a municipality, were exempt from the central government "Health Contribution" tax (Sundhedsbidrag) which stood at 8% when it was introduced on 1 January 2007 with Kommunalreformen ("The Municipal Reform" of 2007), because it was thought that the relatively isolated islets would otherwise be abandoned. This tax replaced the county tax, which the islanders were also exempt from paying, not being part of a county. From 1 January 2019 this tax has been abolished, while income taxes in the lowest bracket have been raised simultaneously instead with this tax being phased out.

== Gallery ==
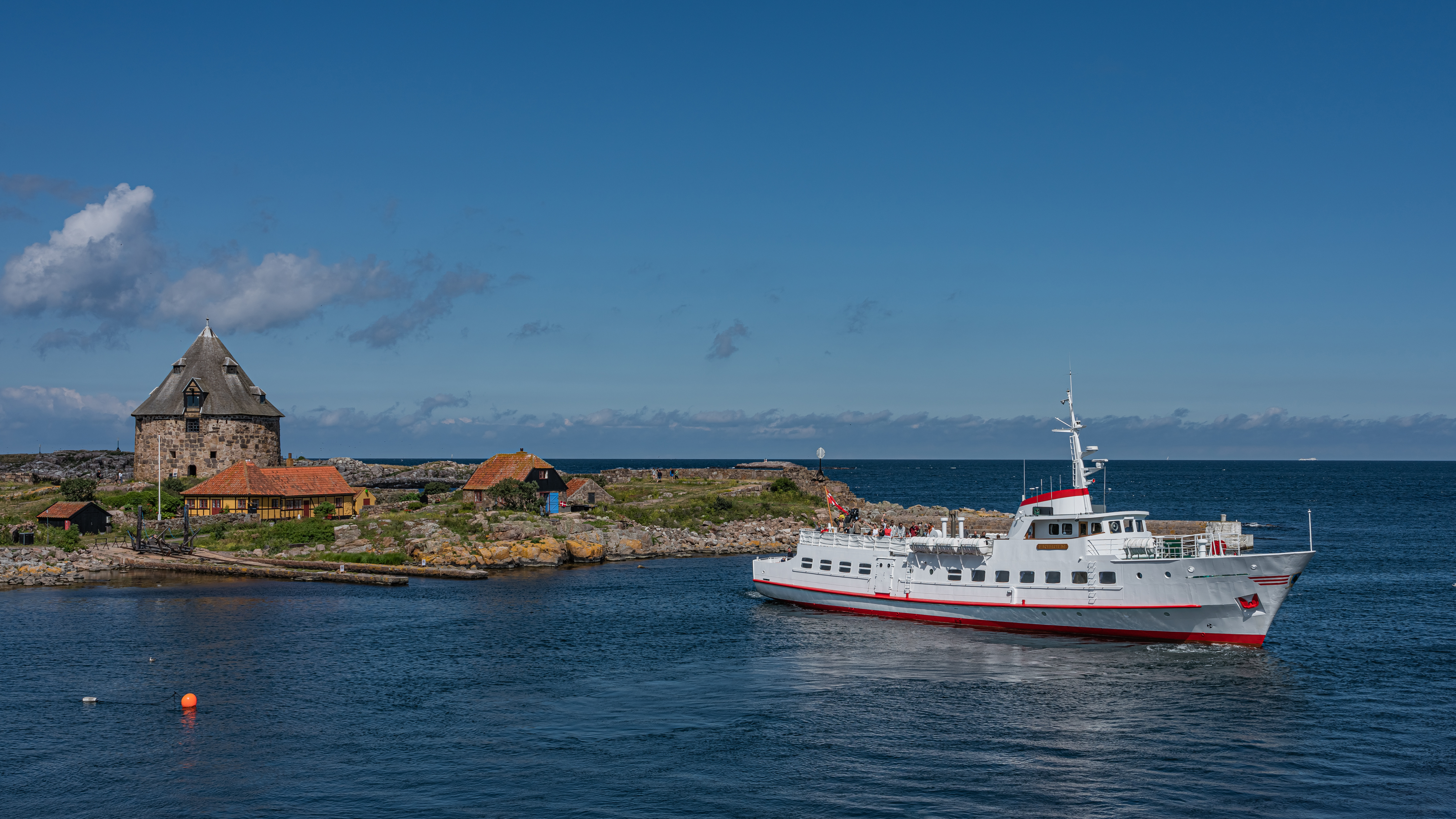
View from Christiansø to Frederiksø

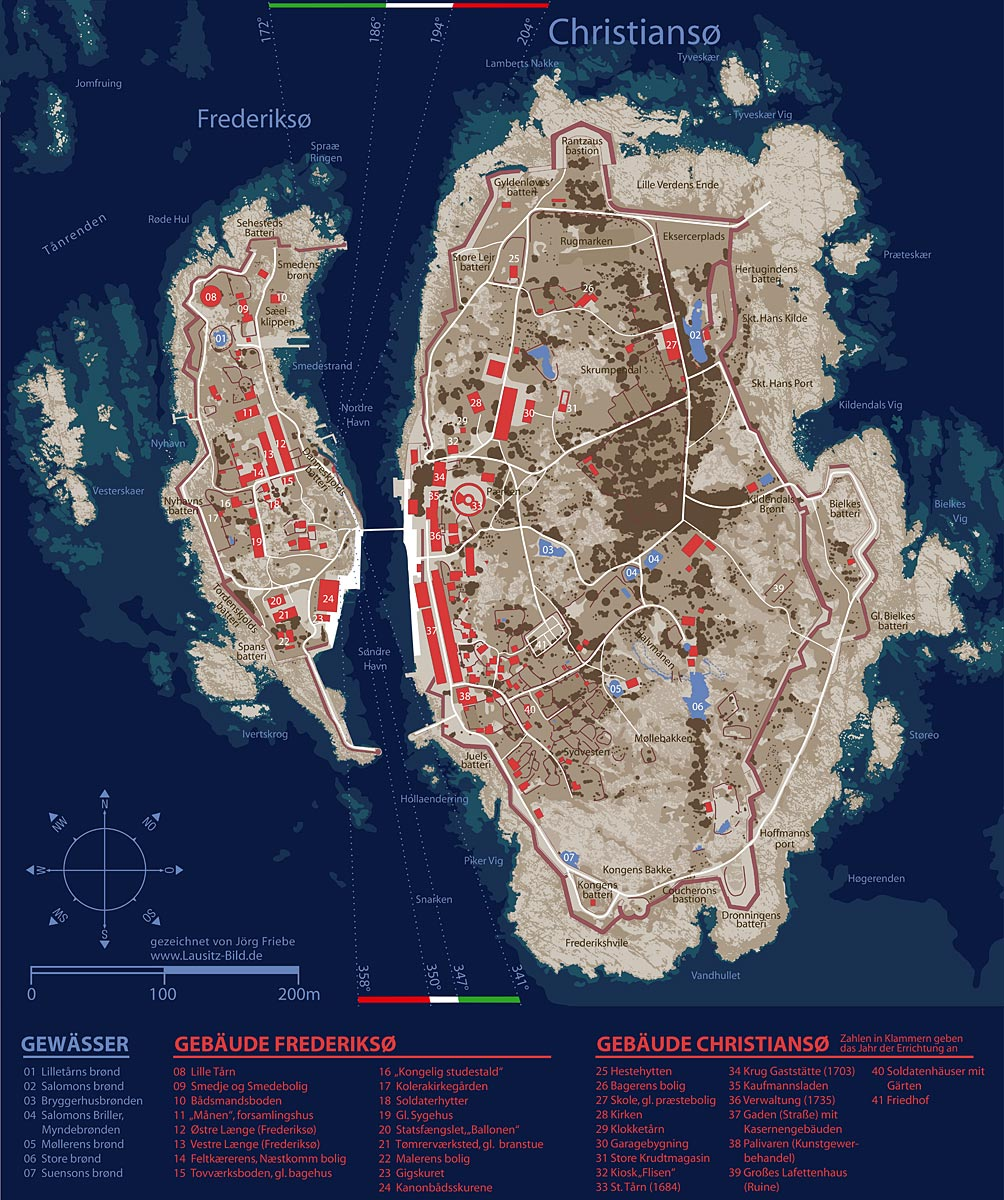
Map of Christiansø and Frederiksø

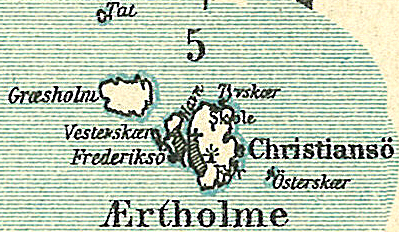
Ærtholmene around 1900

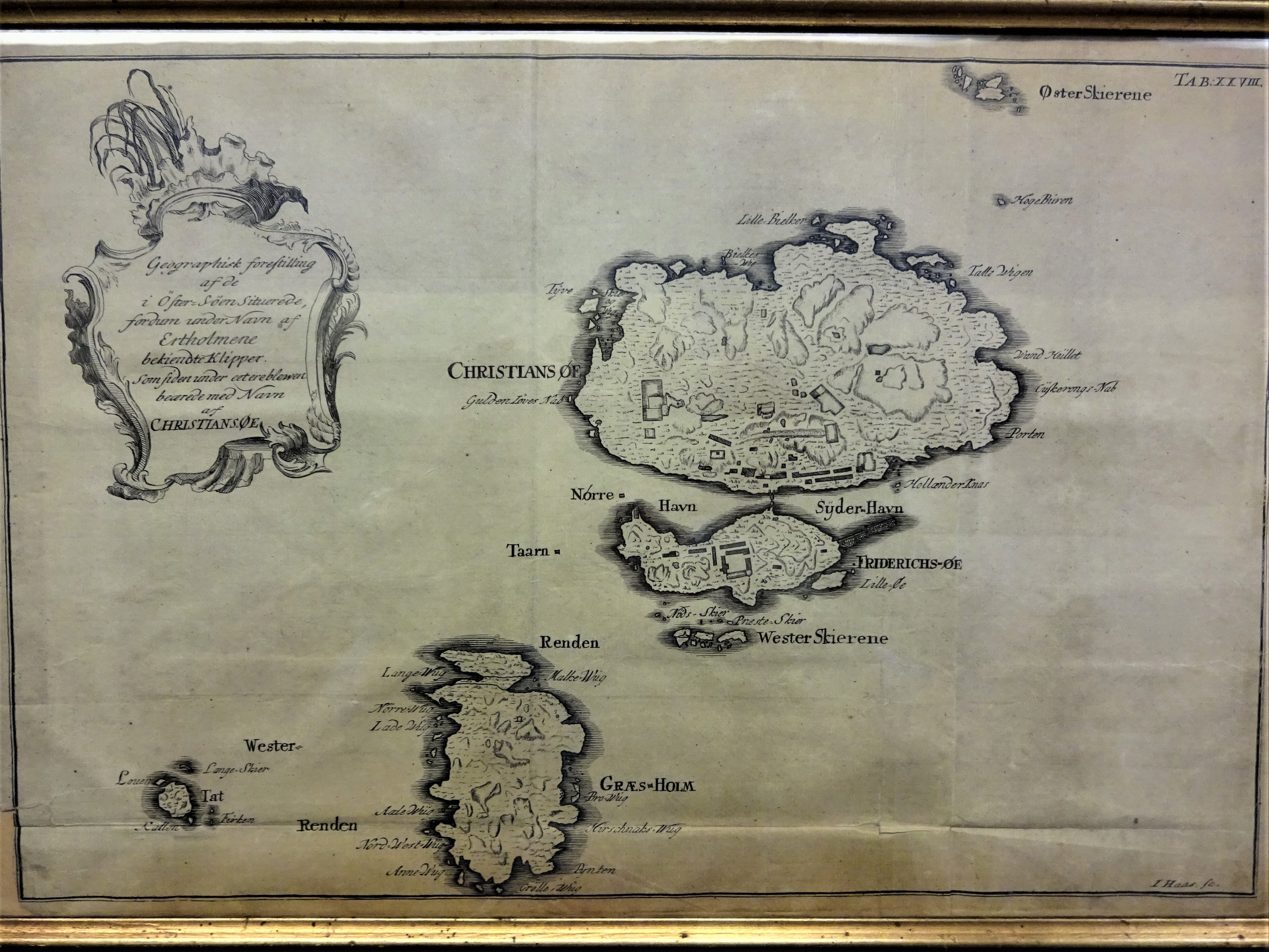
Map of Ertholmene, 1756

Coat of arms of Christiansø

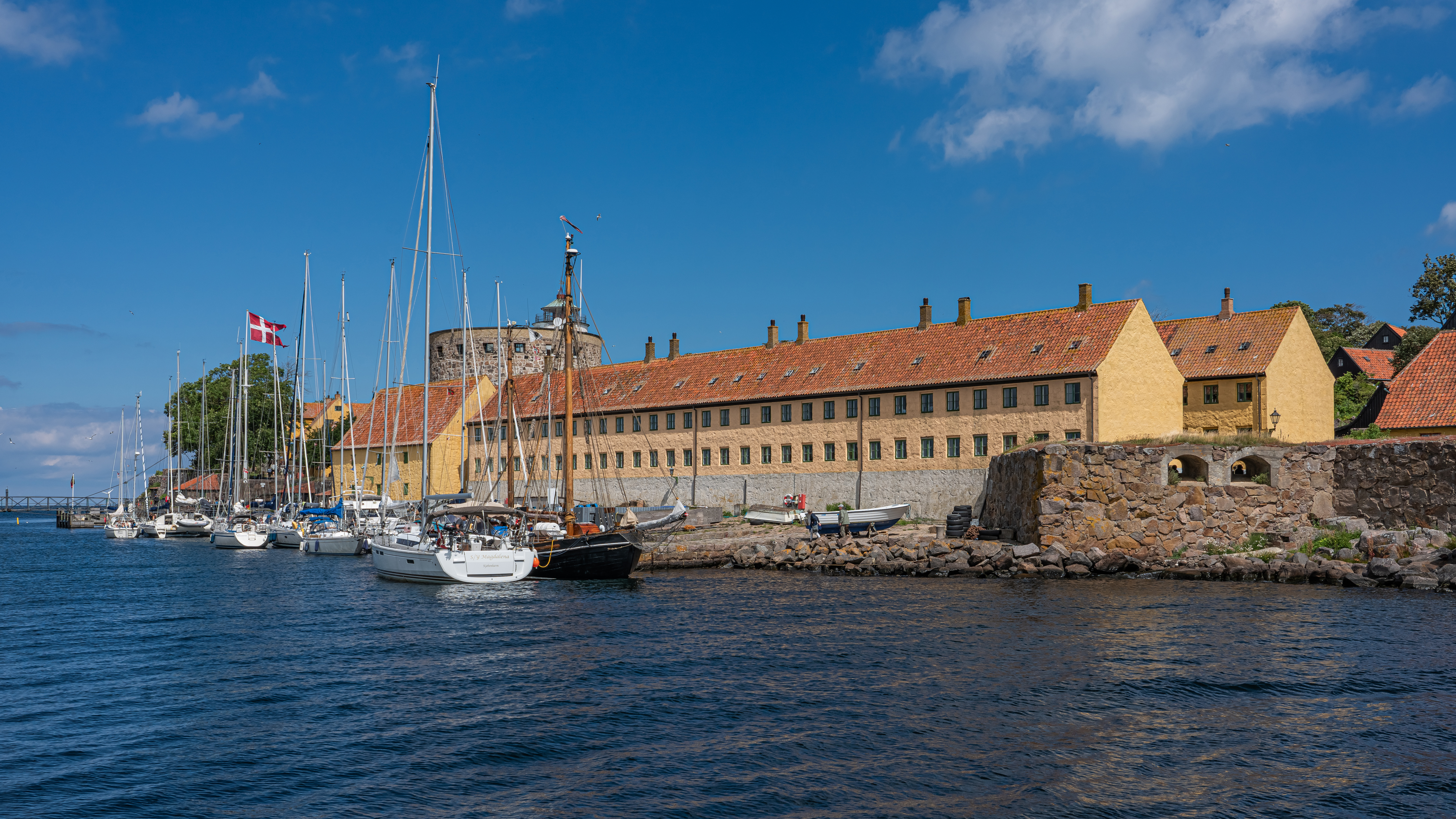
Christiansø Havn
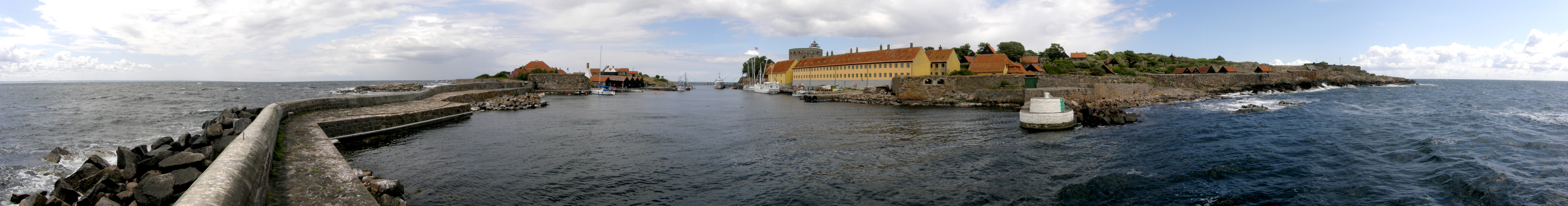
Panorama of Frederiksø and Christiansø
