= Gudhjem =

- Town
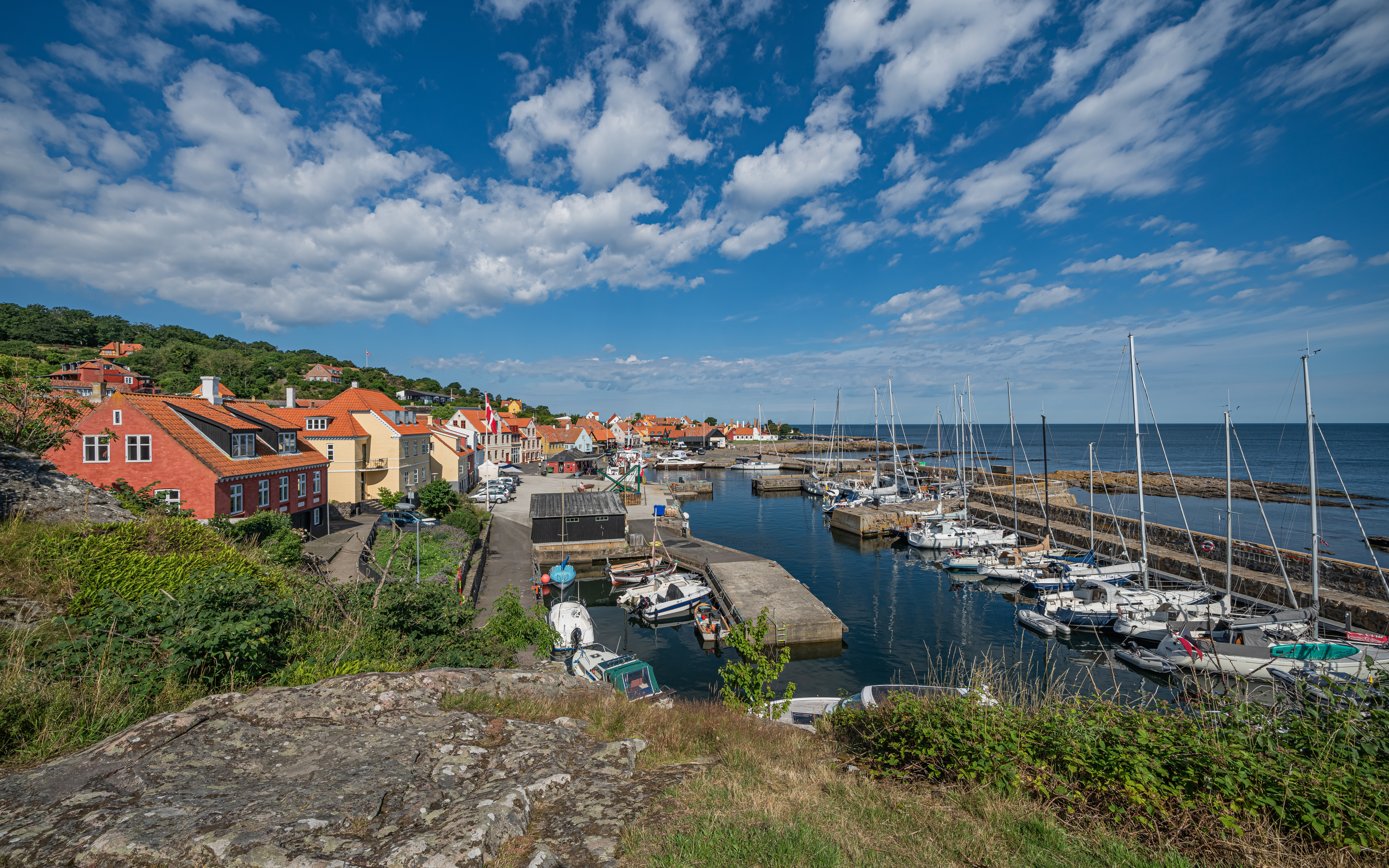
- Gudhjem harbour

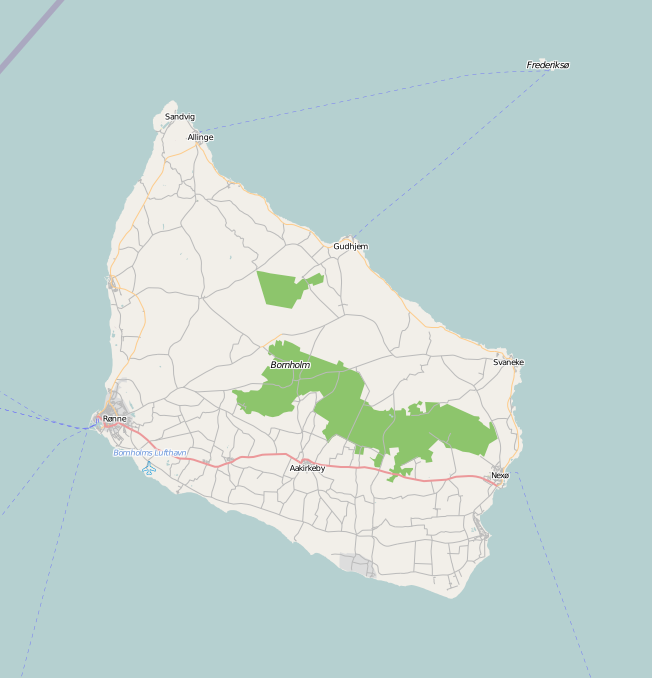
- Location on Bornholm
- Coordinates: 55°12′N 14°58′E
- Country: Denmark
- Region: Capital (Hovedstaden)
- Municipality: Bornholm

Population (2026)
  - Total: 725
- Time zone: UTC+1 (CET)
  - Summer (DST): UTC+2 (CEST)

Gudhjem is a small town and fishing port on the northern coast of the Baltic island of Bornholm, Denmark. As of 1 January 2026, the town has a population of 725.

Gudhjem is a popular venue for tourists who are attracted by its steep, picturesque streets, views and atmosphere.

== History ==
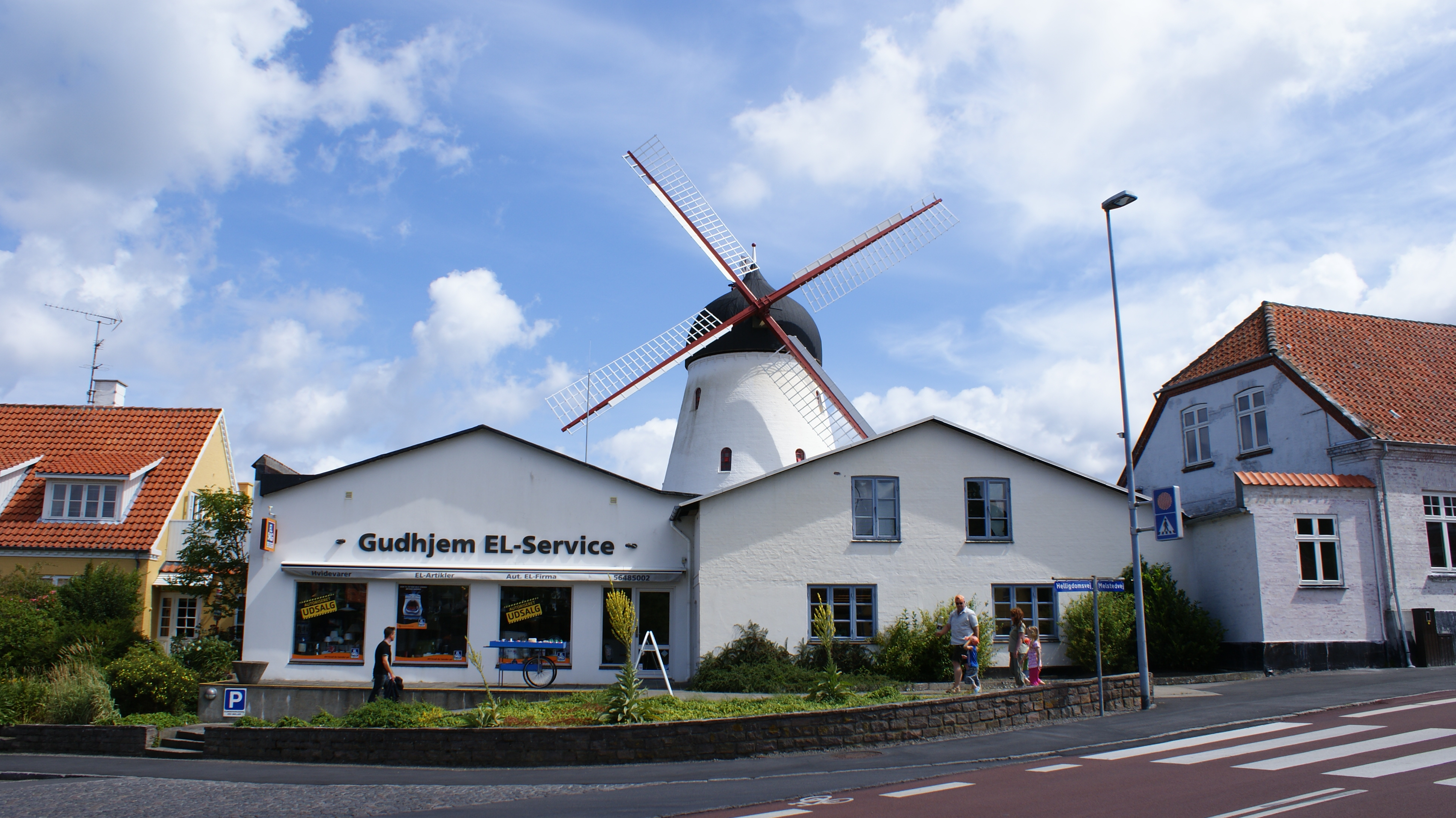
Gudhjem is host to Denmark's largest windmill by volume and wingspan, built in 1893.

Its history as a fishing village goes back many years. The former church, St Anne's Chapel, now a ruin, dates from around 1300. Its harbour was first built in the middle of the 19th century but was destroyed by a storm in 1872 and rebuilt in 1889. A second harbour was constructed between 1897 and 1906 to provide a safe haven for whaling and fishing boats. It was in Gudhjem that smoked herrings were first prepared, in the town's typical smokehouses. Since the 1840s, smoked herrings have been sent to Copenhagen. The Gudhjem-Christiansø ferry has been functioning since 1684. Gudhjem is since 1893 said to be the base of the time zone in Denmark. The Gudhjem meridian (located just east of the town) is one hour east of the Greenwich meridian.

== Landmarks ==
Gudhjem Mølle, Denmark's largest windmill, which stands at the top of the hill down into the town, was constructed in 1893. Taken out of service in 1962, it now houses a shop and a café.

Gudhjem is home to the Oluf Høst Museum where Bornholm's celebrated painter, Oluf Høst, spent the latter part of his life.

== Gallery ==
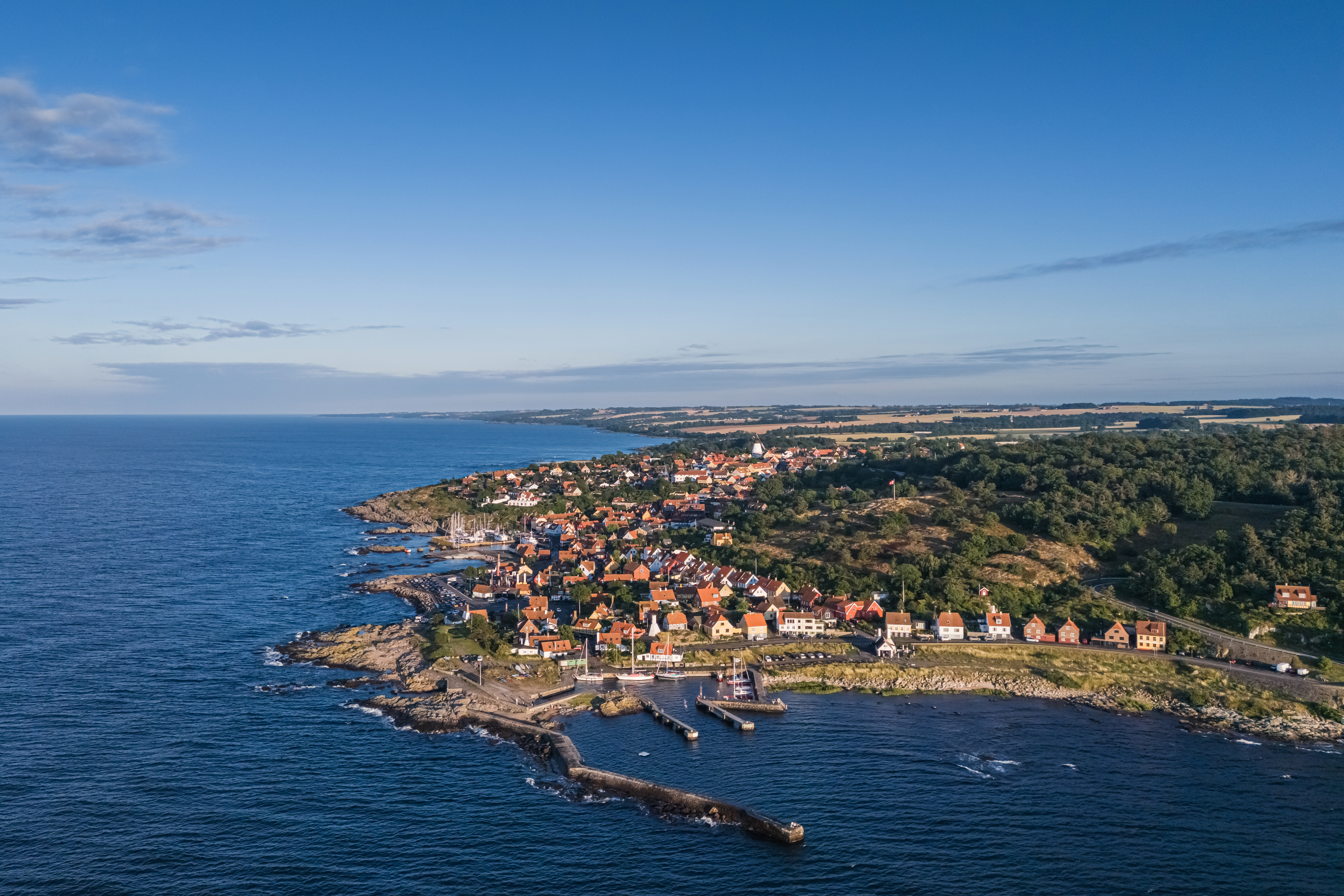
Gudhjem, aerial view

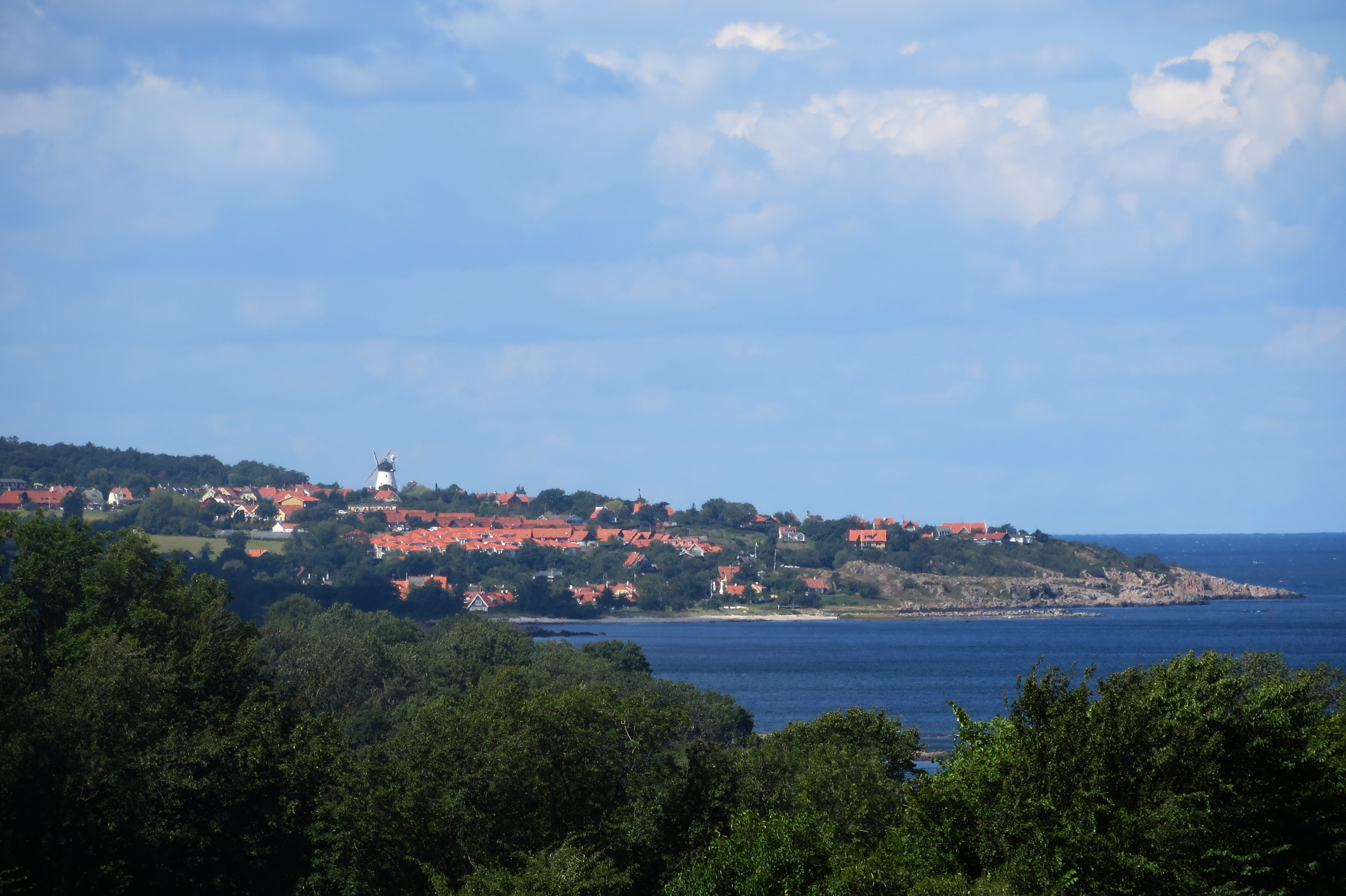
Gudhjem from east

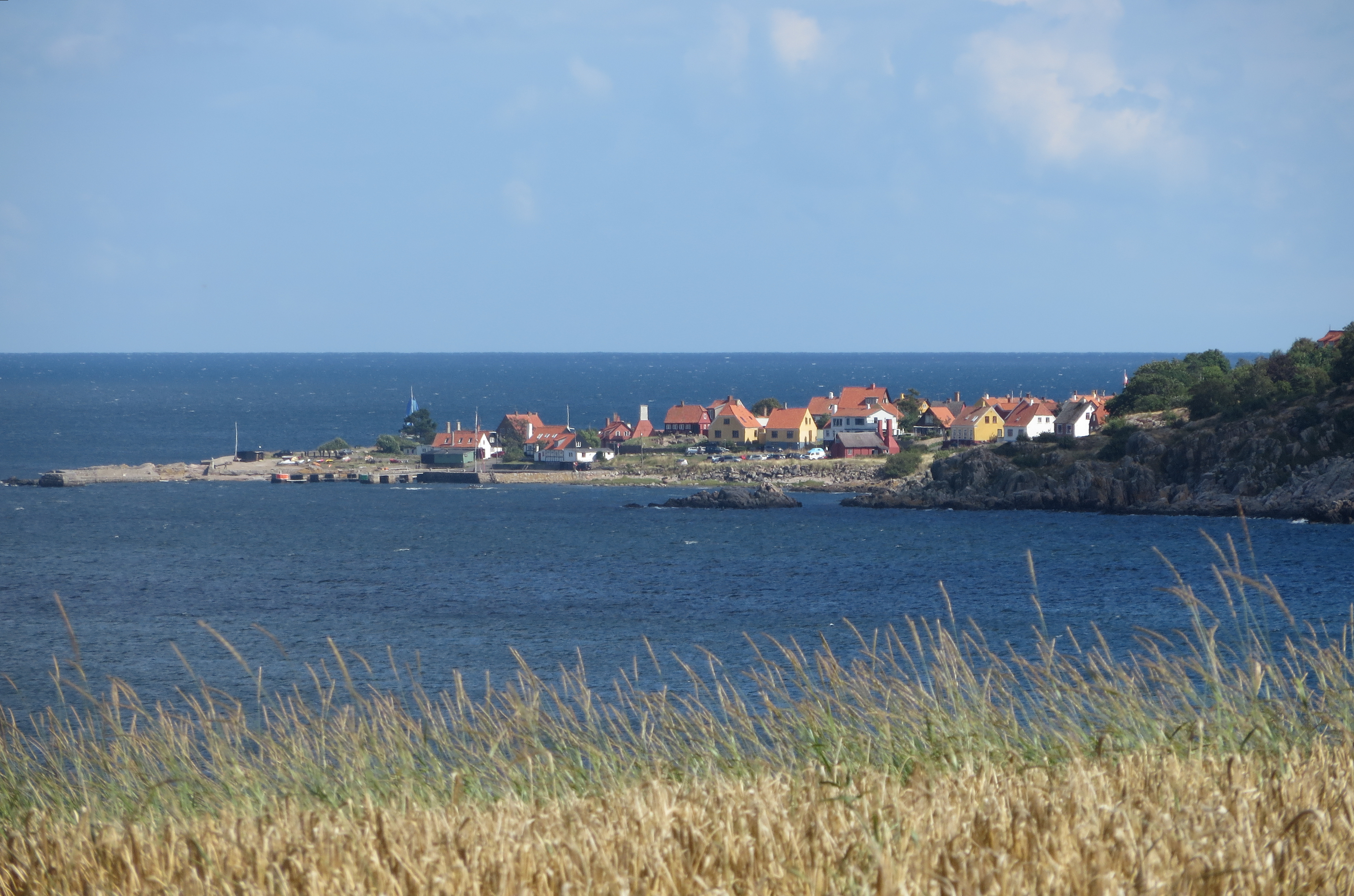
Gudhjem from west
