= Henriques (surname) =

Henriques is a common surname in the Portuguese language, namely in Portugal and Brazil. It was originally a patronymic, meaning Son of Henrique (Henry). Its Spanish equivalent is Enriquez and its Italian equivalent is D'Enrico. Not Jewish in origin but some Sephardic Jews adopted this name.

== List of persons with the surname ==
- Afonso Henriques (1106/11–1185), first king of Portugal
- Afonso Henriques de Lima Barreto (1881–1922), Brazilian novelist and journalist
- Andréa Henriques (born 1980), Brazilian water polo player
- Androula Henriques (born 1936), social activist from Cyprus
- Anna Henriques-Nielsen (1881–1962), Danish actress
- Artur Alberto de Campos Henriques (1853–1922), former prime minister of Portugal
- Basil Henriques (1890–1961), Jewish philanthropist
- Bob Henriques (born 1930), American photojournalist
- Brigitte Henriques (born 1971), French footballer
- Edouard F. Henriques, make-up artist
- Esther Gehlin-Henriques (1892–1949), Danish-Swedish painter
- Fini Henriques (1867–1940), Danish composer
- Francisco Henriques (14??–1518), Flemish Renaissance painter
- Gregg Henriques, American psychologist
- Henrique Henriques (1520–1600), Portuguese Jesuit priest, missionary in South India
- Inês Henriques (born 1980), Portuguese first women's world 50 km race walk champion
- Jacob Henriques de Castro Sarmento (1692–1762), Portuguese estrangeirado, physician and naturalist
- John A. Henriques, United States Revenue Cutter Service officer
- José Félix Henriques Nogueira (1823–1858), Portuguese precursor of socialism and republicanism in Portugal
- Julian Henriques (born 1951), British filmmaker, writer and academic
- Julio Augusto Henriques (1838–1928), Portuguese botanist
- Lagoa Henriques (1923–2009), Portuguese sculptor
- Marie Henriques (1866–1944), Danish-Jewish painter
- Martin Henriques (1825–1912), Danish-Jewish businessman
- Moisés Henriques (born 1987), Portugal-born Australian cricketer
- Moses Cohen Henriques (17th century), Caribbean Jewish pirate
- Nathan Henriques (1820–1848), Danish painter
- Pauline Henriques (1914–1998), Jamaican-born English actress
- Pieter Henriques (17th century), English Jewish merchant
- Raoul Henriques-Raba (born 1930), French sculptor
- Richard Henriques (born 1943), English judge
- Robert Henriques (1905–1967), British writer, broadcaster and farmer
- Robert Henriques (1858–1914), Danish Jewish composer
- Robert Henriques (chemist) (1857–1902), German chemist
- Rose Henriques (1889–1972), British artist
- Ruben Henriques Jr. (1771–1846), Danish Jewish banker
- Sally Henriques (1815–1886), Jewish Danish painter
- Samuel Henriques (1821–1893), Jewish Danish painter
- Sean Paul Henriques (born 1973), Jamaican reggae artist known as Sean Paul
- Vicente Henriques (born 1978), Brazilian water polo player
- Diana B. Henriques (born 1948), American financial journalist and author

== See also ==
Shirley Henriquez: Actress and Model

- Henriques family
