= Ruben Henriques Jr. =

Danish banker

Ruben Henriques
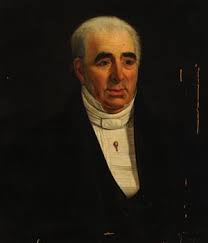
- Ruben Henriques painted by his son Sally Henriques
- Born: 21 January 1771; Copenhagen, Denmark
- Died: 22 January 1846 (aged 75); Copenhagen, Denmark
- Occupation: Businessman
- Known for: Danish West India Company; Sophienholm
- Spouse(s): Husband of Frederikke Rée and Jeruchim-Jorika Henriques

Ruben Henriques Jr. (1771–1846) was a Danish banker. He founded the brokerage firm R. Henriques jr. in 1801.

== Early life and career ==
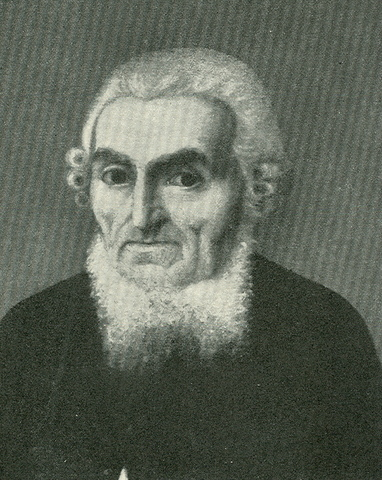
Henriques' father Bendix Moses Henriques.

Ruben Henriques Jr. was born into the Jewish Henriques family in 1771 in Copenhagen, the son of Bendix Moses Henriques and Elischewa Chawa Henriques. He founded the brokerage firm R. Henriques jr. in 1801. It grew and Henriques became one of the richest men in Copenhagen. The company was based in a building on Amagertorv.

== Family ==
Ruben Henriques Jr. married twice. His first wife was Frederikke Rée and his second wife was Jeruchim-Jorika Henriques. He had a total of 18 children. Two of his sons, Aron and Martin Henriques, took over the company in 1852. Sally Henriques, Samuel Henriques and Nathan Henriques, were all painters. His granddaughter Marie Henriques, the youngest daughter of Martin Henrigues, was also a painter.

His daughter Dorothea Melchior née Henriques was a close friend of Hans Christian Andersen.
