= Mosaisk Vestre Begravelsesplads =

Jewish cemetery in Copenhagen

Jewish Western Cemetery
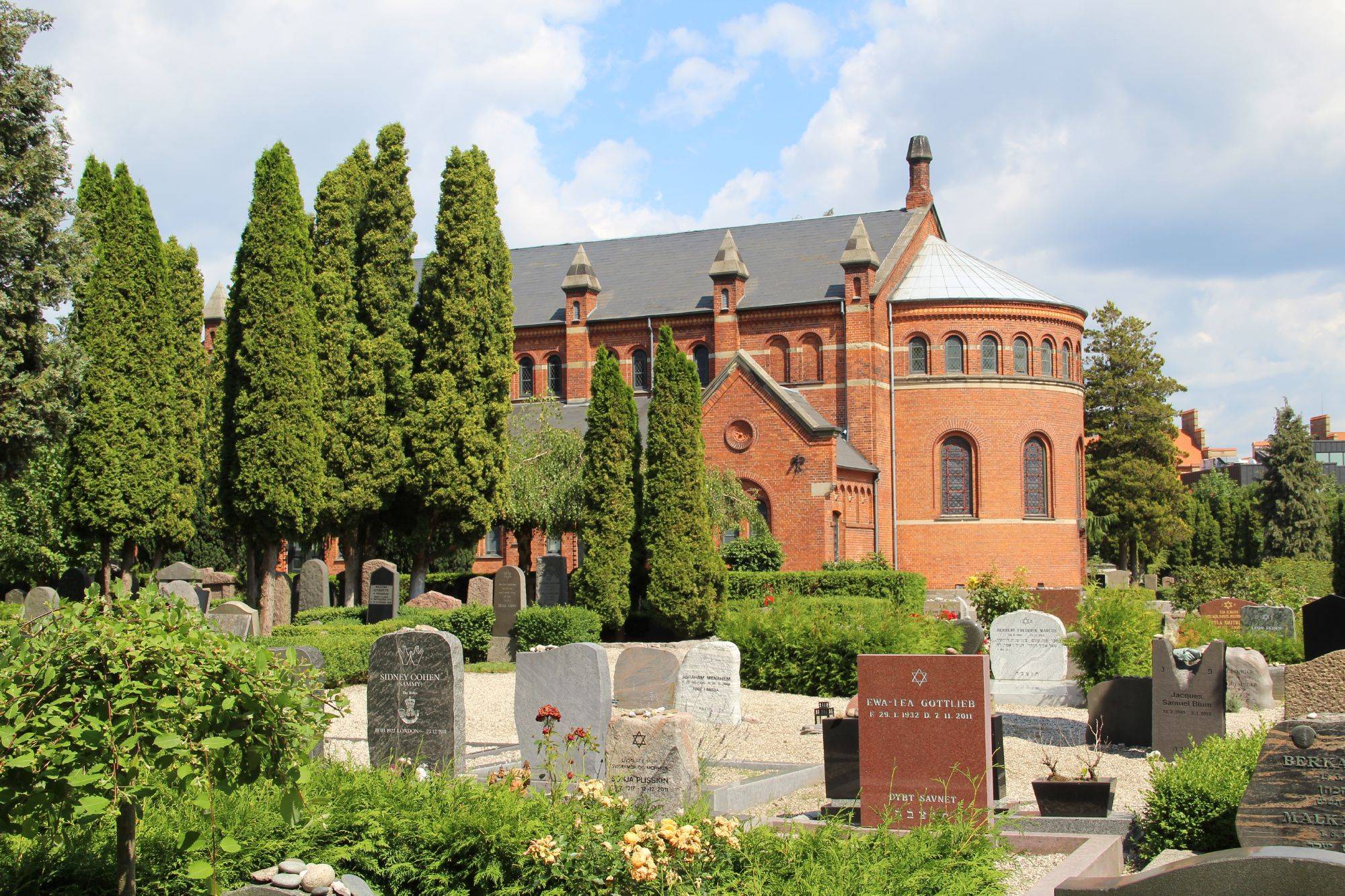
- The gatehouse
- Interactive map of Jewish Western Cemetery

Details
- Established: 1886
- Location: Kongens Enghave, Copenhagen
- Country: Denmark
- Coordinates: 55.6606°N 12.5348°E
- Type: Jewish (active)

Mosaisk Vestre Begravelsesplads is a Jewish cemetery in Copenhagen.

== History ==
The Jewish Western Cemetery was established in 1886. The chapel was designed by Frederik L. Levy. The Inspector's House was also designed by Levy.

== Monuments and memorials ==
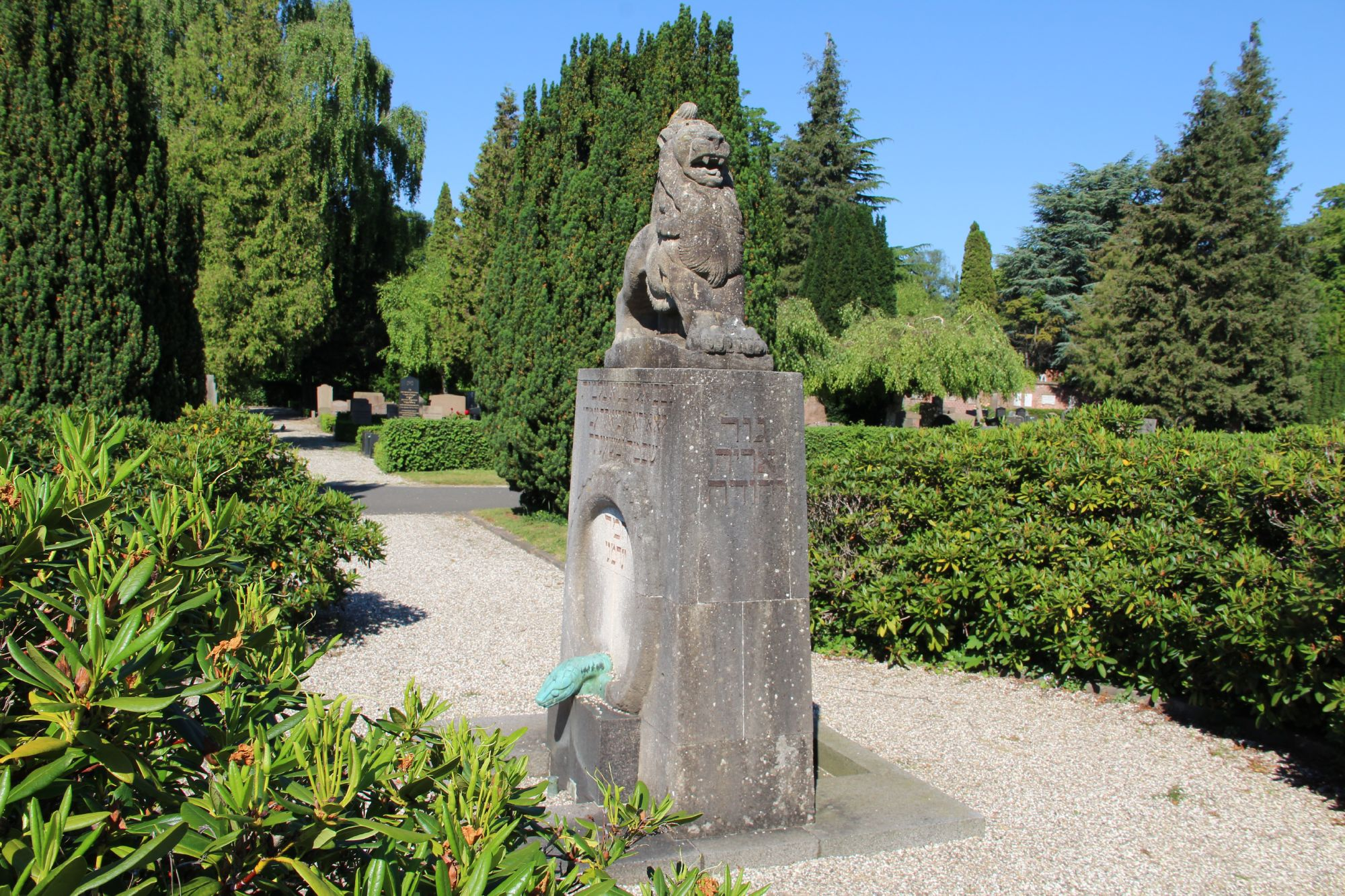
Wagner's Lion of Judah at the Jewish Western Cemetery in Copenhagen.

Monuments in the cemetery grounds include a Lion of Judah, in limestone, created in 1929 by the sculptor Siegfried Wagner.

== Notable interments ==
Notable burials include:

- Bertha Abrahamson
- Florence Abrahamson
- Ada Adler (1878–1946), classical scholar
- Pia Ahnfelt-Rønne
- Max Ballin
- Ove Behrens
- Albert Berendsen
- Ivar Berendsen
- Sam Besekow
- Anton Bing
- Frederik Bing
- Harald Bing
- Herman Meyer Bing
- Jacob Martin Bing
- Laurids Bing
- Jacques Blum
- Victor Borge (1909–2000), US/Danish conductor, pianist, and comedian. Part of his ashes are buried here, the remainder at Putnam Cemetery, Greenwich, Connecticut, US.
- Ernst Brandes
- L.I. Brandes
- Fanny Hannover Cohen
- Just Cohen
- Georg Cohn
- M.J. Davidsen
- Thora Davidsen
- Joseph Davidsohn
- David Dessau
- Harry Dessau
- Martin Dessau
- Peter Deutsch, composer
- L. Elsass
- Leon Feder
- Meïr Feigenberg
- Josef Fischerm historian
- Isi Foighel
- Celli Freifeldt
- L.S. Fridericia
- Max Friediger
- Henry Frænkel
- Louis Frænkel
- G.A. Gedalia
- Herman Gellin
- Rudolf Gellin
- Isak Glückstadt
- Agnete Goldschmidt
- M.J. Goldschmidt
- Meïr Goldschmidt
- Moritz Goldschmidt
- Ragnhild Goldschmidt
- Albert Gottschalk, painter
- Arje Griegst
- Louis Halberstadt
- Arne Hamburger
- A. Hannover
- H.I. Hannover
- Berendt Hartvig
- Frits Hartvigson, pianist
- Dorothea Heckscher
- Nathan Heine (1835–1914), lawyer
- Isidor Henius
- Arthur Henriques
- Axel Henriques
- C.B. Henriques
- Marie Henriques (1866–1944), painter
- Robert Henriques, composer and writer
- Valdemar Henriques
- Alfred Abraham Hertz
- Philip Heyman (1837–1893), businessman
- Michel Hildesheim
- Harald Hirschsprung (1830,–1916), businessman
- Heinrich Hirschsprung (1836–1908), businessman
- Aage Hirschsprung
- Harald Isenstein
- Emil Frederik Jacob, businessman
- Axel Jacobsen
- Bertil Jardorf
- Fritz Kalckar
- Janina Katz (1939–2013), writer
- Lillian Kauffmann
- Henrik Koppel
- Ida Koppel
- Abraham Kurland (1912–1999), Danish wrestler, won silver at the 1932 Summer Olympics boycotted the Berlin Olympics, and competed in the 1948 Summer Olympics
- Kenth Kærhøg
- Clara Lachmann (1864–1920), Danish-Swedish patron of the arts
- Jacob L. Lachmann
- Tonny Lehmann
- Herman Lercher
- Ad. J. Levin
- I. Levin
- Otto Levin
- Birgitte Levison
- Salomon Levysohn
- Oscar Lewisohn
- Erwin Magnus
- J.H. Mannheimer
- Arne Melchior (1924–2016), politician
- Bent Melchior
- Carl H. Melchior
- J.H. Melchior
- Marcus Melchior
- Emil Laurids Meyer, bank manager
- Jacob Frederik Meyer, engineer
- Louis Meyer, businessman
- S.N. Meyer
- Joseph Michaelsen
- David Monies (1812-1894), painter
- Mélanie Oppenhejm
- Ralph Oppenhejm
- Gustav Philipsen
- Sally Philipsen
- Jørgen J. Polack
- Frantz Rabinowitz
- Israel Rachlin
- Rachel Rachlin
- Adolph Rastén
- Anton Rée
- Eduard Rée
- Olly Ritterband
- Simon Rosenbaum, actor/entertainer
- E. Israel Rosenthal
- Hugo Rothenberg
- Max Rothenborg
- Marcus Rubin
- Emil B. Sachs
- Bent Saks
- Isac Salmonsen
- Frederik Salomon
- C.J. Salomonsen
- Carl Salomonsen
- Isak Salomon Salomonsen
- Martin Salomonsen
- Joseph Samson
- Fini Schulsinger, businessman
- Georg Seligmann
- Oscar Siesbye
- David Simonsen (1757-1932), Chief Rabbi, writer and book collector
- Poul Simonsen
- Rudolph Simonsen (1889-1947), composer
- Meïr Stein
- Jacob Texière
- Bent Thalmay
- Adolph Trier
- Carl Aage Trier
- Frederik Trier
- Herman Trier (1845–1925), Danish educator and politician
- Svend Trier
- Dan Uzan
- Pinches Welner
- Kjeld Wennick
- Carl Wulff
