= Henriques family =

Jewish Spanish family

Henriques is a Portuguese surname meaning Son of Henrique (Henry). The Henriques family has many branches, each with a somewhat different surname. In 16th century Portugal, dozens of New Christian families used the name singly or in combination with others, such as Henriques de Castro, Cohen Henriques Eanes, Henriques de Souza, Henriques de Sousa, Henriques Faro, Mendes Henriques, Gabay Henriques, Lopes Henriques, Gomes Henriques, Henriques da Costa, Henriques da Granada, Henriques Coelho, and many more. Once they left Portugal and reverted to Judaism, they took more Jewish first names and often inserted Jewish tribal designations, such as Cohen and Israel, just before "Henriques", such as Cohen Henriques and Israel Henriques.

Nevertheless, part of the Henriques family that fled Portugal during and after the Spanish Inquisition are descended or related to the patriarch of the family, Henriques Dias Milao-Caceres.

Jamaican singer Sean Paul is a notable member of the Henriques family, as both he and his brother, Jason Henriques have Portuguese ancestry on their father's side, Garth Henriques.

== Origins ==
The Henriques family descend from the Jews of Spain, who fled from religious persecution to Portugal in 1492. Although led to believe they would be permitted to practice Judaism freely in Portugal, they were forcibly converted to Catholicism upon their arrival. These "Marranos", or "New Christians", continued to strongly relate to their Jewish origins and married each other. Their descendants became assimilated, participating in and contributing to the economic life of Portugal and its empire. Some were elevated to the peerage for their patriotism.

== History ==
Henriques Dias Milao-Caceres (1528–1609) was a wealthy Catholic businessman from Lisbon who was arrested by the Spanish Inquisition during the Iberian Union on charges of not having paid taxes, having dealings with the Jews, and for having attempted to flee the country before trial. Most of his family and entourage who had not managed to leave the country on time, had also been arrested and interrogated by the Inquisition. At the age of 82, Henriques Dias Milao-Caceres was sentenced to death, along with his manservant, who was believed to have converted secretly to Judaism, and a female member of his family. They were burned at the stake on 5 April 1609. The rest of the family members, lives spared, witnessed the execution and subsequently took on the surname Henriques in his memory, thus beginning the family we know today. Those who adopted the surname include Henriques's son, Paulo (Moses) de Milao; his daughter Beatriz (married to Alvaro Dinis Yachia Eanes); and his grandson, Reuben Eanes (son of Beatriz).

== British branch ==
The Israel Henriques family included several prominent Sephardic Jewish benefactors of Portuguese descent during the 17th century in Great Britain.

A West-Indian merchant firm called Henriques Brothers existed in the 19th century owned by the Cohen Henriques family.

The Israel Henriques branch of the family migrated to England at the end of the 17th century. The middle name Quixano stems from the marriage of Moses Israel Henriques (the son of Jacob Israel Henriques [1719–1758] and Rebecca bas David Bravo) and Abigail Quixano Henriques, his second cousin, the daughter of Abraham Quixano Henriques, the son of Isaac and Rachel Mendes Quixano.

Members of the family include:

- Basil Henriques, British philanthropist
- Robert Henriques, British novelist
- Jack Henriques, British engineer and photographer
- Aaron Henriques, British metropolitan police officer, magistrate, entrepreneur and investor

== Indian & Netherlands branch ==
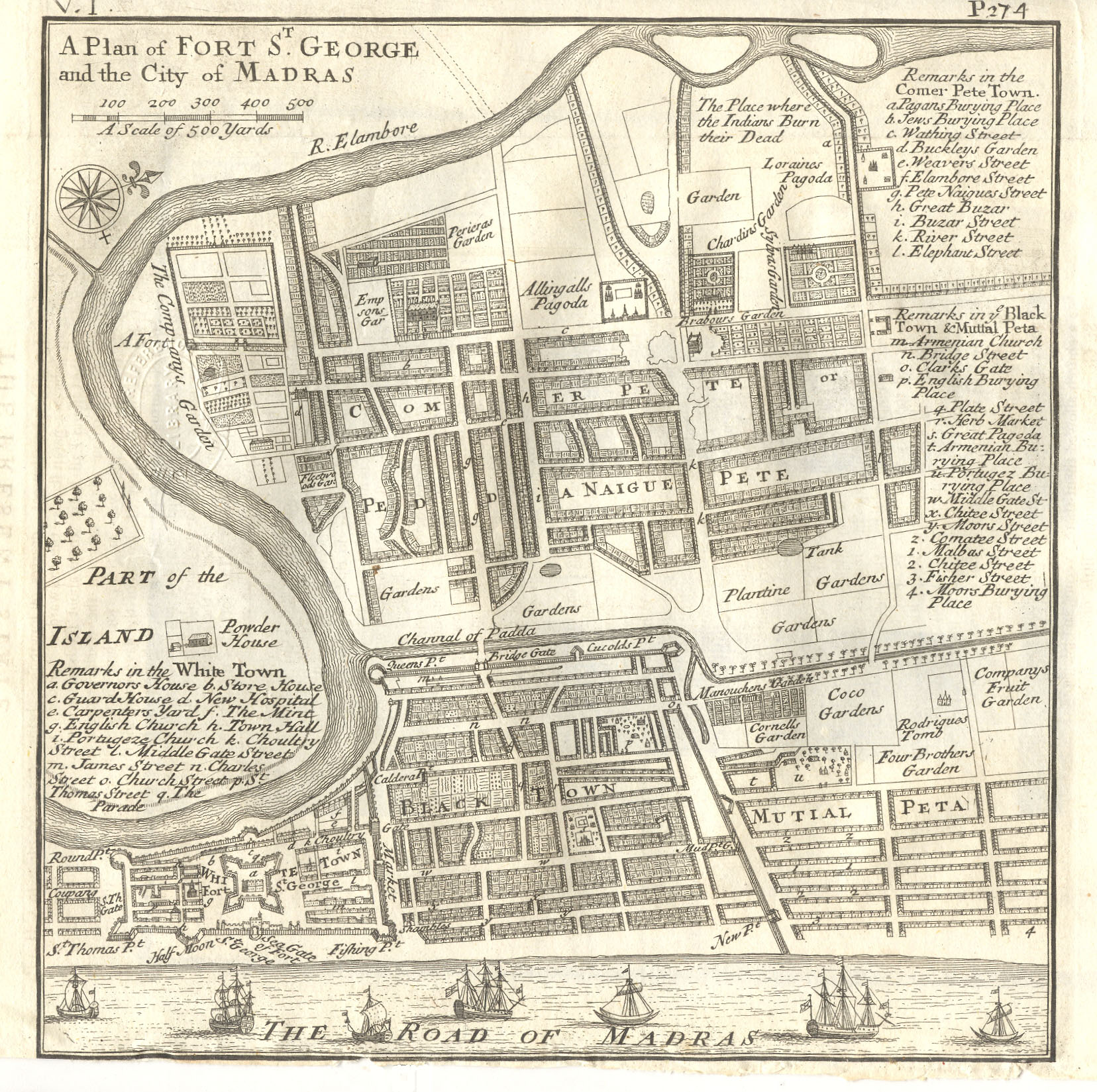
Plan of Fort St George and the city of Madras in 1726, Shows b. Jews Burying Place Jewish Cemetery Chennai, Four Brothers Garden and Bartolomeo Rodrigues Tomb

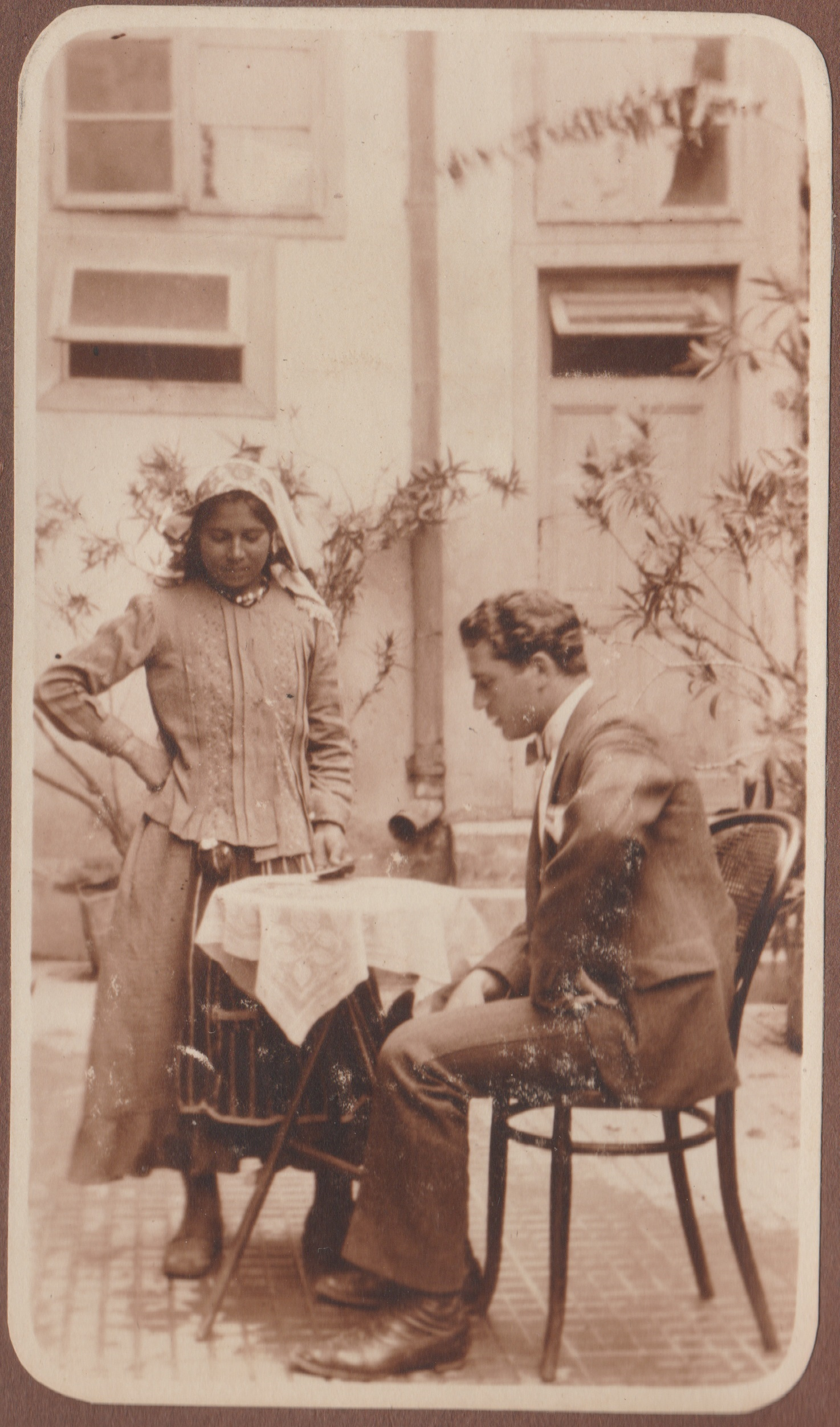
Rabbi Salomon Halevi(Last Rabbi of Madras Synagogue) and his wife Rebecca Cohen, Paradesi Jews of Madras

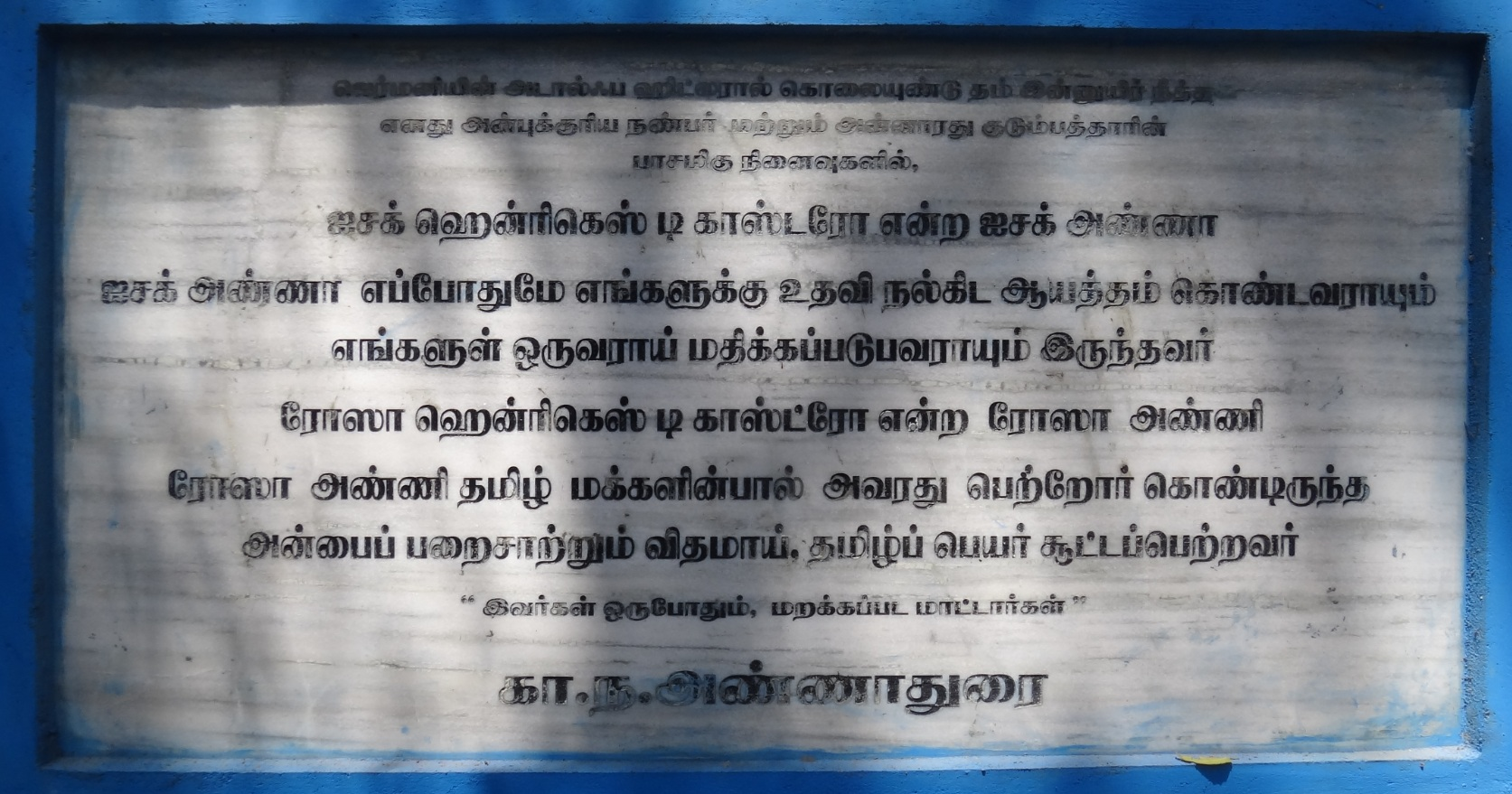
Holocaust Memorial of Isaac & Rosa Henriques Decastro, Paradesi Jews of Madras

The Henriques De Castro family included several prominent Sephardic Jewish Business men of Portuguese descent, they were called Paradesi Jews of Madras. They traded in diamonds, precious stones and corals, they had very good relations with the rulers of Golkonda, they maintained trade connections to Europe, and their language skills were useful. Although the Sephardim spoke Ladino (i.e. Spanish or Judeo-Spanish), in India they learned Tamil and Judeo-Malayalam from the Malabar Jews.

Notable members of this branch include:

- Samuel de Castro: who came to Madras from Curaçao and founded the De Castro Trading house.
- Fernando Mendes Henriques: established The Colony of Jewish Traders of Madraspatam

The last Jewish Business House of Chennai, owned by the Henriques De Castro Family, existed until 2007, including Henriques De Castro Transports, Henriques De Castro Industrial and management consultants as well as Isaac and Rosa Charitable Trust, Henriques De Castro family.

Members of the family include:

- Isaac Henriques De Castro (9 June 1883 in Amsterdam-18 October 1944 in Auschwitz)
- Levi Henriques De Castro(12 March 1921 in Amsterdam-8 February 1978 in Chennai)
- Sarah Levi
- Davvid Levi

A Holocaust Memorial exists for Isaac and Rosa Henriques Decastro; its content is translated as:

In loving memory of My beloved friend and his family

Who were murdered by Adolf Hitler, Germany.

Isaac Henriques De Castro Alias Isaac Anna (Brother), Isaac Anna was always ready to help us and considered to be one among us

Rosa Henriques De Castro Alias Rosa Anni (Sister In-law), Rosa Anni was named with a Tamil name, showing the love her parents had for Tamil people

“They Will Never, be Forgotten”

C N Annadurai Former Chief Minister of Tamil Nadu

== German branch ==
Notable members of this branch:

- Joseph Ben Brith, the author of Die Odyssee de Henrique-Familie

== Danish branch ==
The progenitor of the Danish branch of the family was Moses Henriques (Cornelis Janssen was his business name), a burgess in Glückstadt in northern Germany, who was the paternal grandfather of the mathematician, Moses Joshua Henriques (1635–1716). Moses Joshua Henriques was married to his cousin, who had given birth to a son from a previous marriage named Moses Aron Nathan Henriques (Meusche Nasche was his Yiddish name), who died in 1744. He's believed to have moved to Nakskov on the island of Lolland in southern Denmark. Three of his sons and one niece, are believed to have adopted the name Henriques. The Danish branch of the Henriques family is widely known. Some members of the family moved to Sweden.

Notable members of this branch include:

- Ruben Henriques Jr. (1771–1846), banker
- Sally Henriques (1815 -1886), painter
- Martin Henriques (1825 -1912), banker
- Robert Henriques, composer and editor
- Marie Henriques (1866–1944), painter
- Fini Henriques (1867–1940), Danish violinist and composer.
- Elna Emilie Henriques (1866–1938), sister of Fini Henriques and wife of Hans Severin Christensen (1867–1933), Danish physician and philosopher, who co-founded the Justice Party of Denmark.
- Helga Henriques (1861-1924), sister of Fini Henriques. She married and moved to Sweden, her descendants live there.

== Swedish branch ==
Merchant Bendix (Pinchas) Moses Henriques (1725–1807), one of Moses Aaron Nathan Henriques sons, became a Danish citizen in 1752 and moved to Copenhagen. However, in 1786 he moved to Marstrand and from there down to Gothenburg in 1794. He became the first chairman of the Gothenburg Jewish community. His daughter Göthilda Magnus (1767–1825) donated funds to the Göthilda School (Göthildaskolan) in Gothenburg. The Warburg family is descended from another daughter of Bendix (Pinchas) Moses Henriques.

Businessman Aaron Moses Henriques (1782–1839) was the nephew of Bendix Moses Henriques. In 1809 he received the honorary title of Burgess in Gothenburg, and became joint owner of a sugar mill in Liseberg as well as a soap factory in Krokslätt which went bankrupt in 1820. The artist Hugo Henriques (1864–1910) is his grandson.

The Copenhagen businessman Ruben Moses Henriques (1716–1771) was the half-brother of Bendix Moses Henriques. He was the father of merchant Moses Ruben Henriques (or Mausche Ber) (1757–1823), who from 1787 to 1796 lived in Marstrand and then returned to Copenhagen. Where the family consisted, for example, of his wife Rachel "Rebecca" (1766-1828) and his mother the widow Milka, née Delbanco (1730–1807) according to Danish censuses in 1801. His grandson, Meyer Ruben Henriques (1813–1874), was one of the six founders of the Jewish Reformist Association in 1841 in Stockholm. In 1846, he became head teacher at the Göthilda School (Göthildaskolan), and between 1851 and 1857, the second preacher in the synagogue, where he worked with three others and the rabbi on new prayers, the synagogue, and the ceremonial process.

Pontus Herman Henriques (1852–1933) was the son of Meyer Ruben Henriques. One of his daughters was Elin Brandell (1882–1963), who went on to become a famous journalist. His son, Emil Henriques (1883–1957), was a lawyer. Another son was Pontus Ragnar Henriques (1913–1970) head of advertising at Expressen.

Another son of Meyer Ruben Henriques was the businessman Wilhelm Julius Henriques (1853–1931). Wilhelm Julius Henriques was the father of Marten Henriques, a lawyer (1886–1974), and Einar Henriques (born 1889), a salesman. Einar Henriques was the father of Ake Henriques (1918–2013), a mineralogist at KTH.

== Literature ==
Die Odyssee de Henriques-Familie was written about the Henriques family in German by a member of the family, Joseph Ben Brith. It includes extensive research and a detailed family tree.
