= Brønnum House =

Historic building in Copenhagen, Denmark

- Brønnums Hus
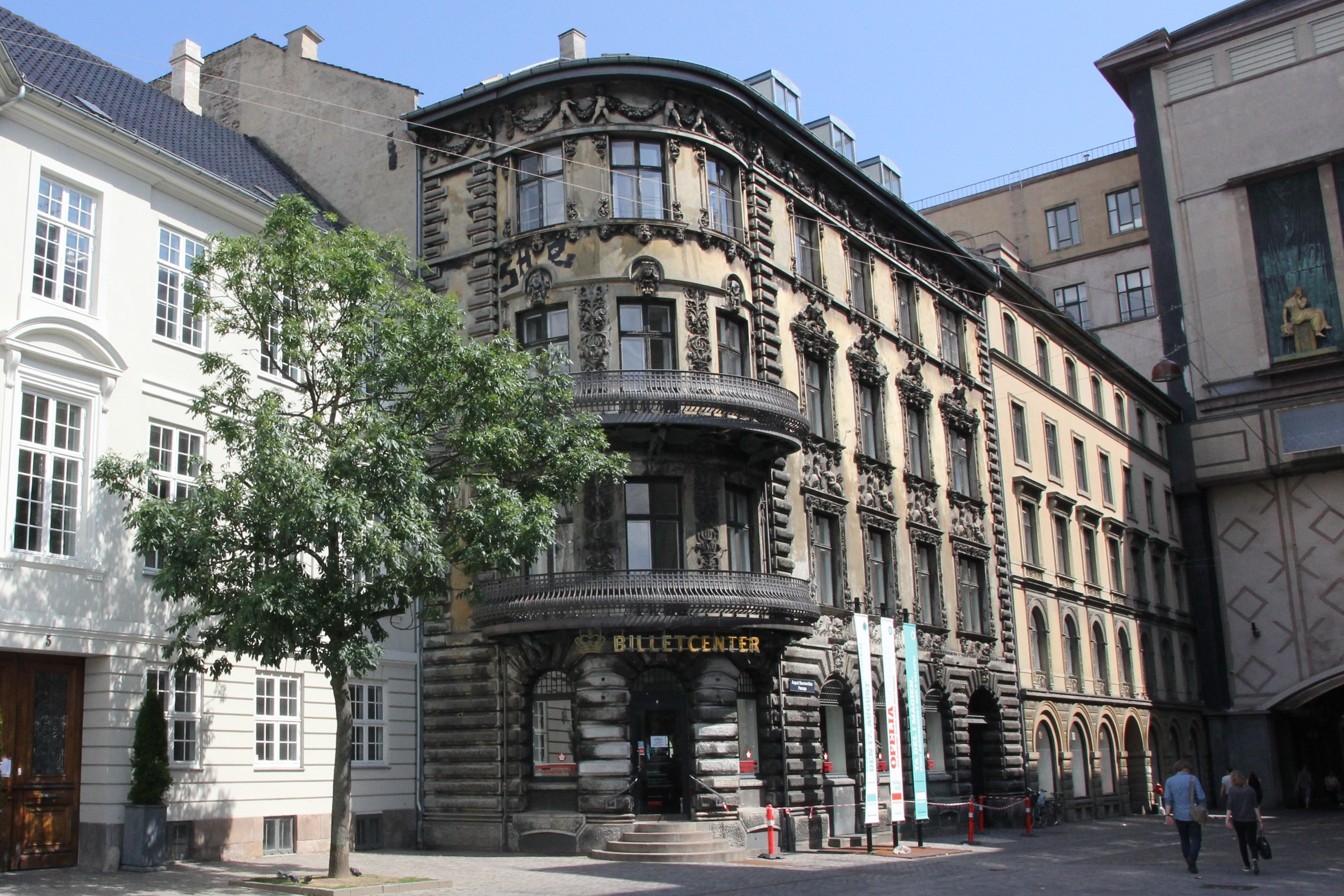
- Brønnum House as seen from Kongens Nytorv, flanked by Harsdorff House to the left and Stærekassen to the right
- Interactive map of the Brønnum House area

General information
- Architectural style: Historicism
- Location: Copenhagen, Denmark
- Coordinates: 55°40′46.57″N 12°35′12.5″E
- Construction started: 1665
- Completed: 1666
- Owner: Karberghus

Design and construction
- Architect: Ferdinand Vilhelm Jensen

Brønnum House (Danish: Brønnums Hus) is a richly decorated 1860s apartment building situated adjacent to the Toyal Danish Theatre's Stærekassen extension and the Harsdorff House on Kongens Nytorv in central Copenhagen, Denmark. It was constructed as one of the first new buildings when the former Gammelholm naval dockyards was transformed into a new residential neighborhood. Café Brønnum, frequented by actors from the adjacent theatre, was based in the building for more than 100 years. The homes of the wealthy Jewish businessman Martin Henriques and Bernhard Hirschsrpung on the first and second floor were both frequented by some of the leading cultural figures of their time. The building was listed in the Danish registry of protected buildings and places in 1995. The building is now owned by Karberghus. It houses a high-end cocktail bar on the ground floor and serviced offices on the upper floors.

== History ==
=== construction ===
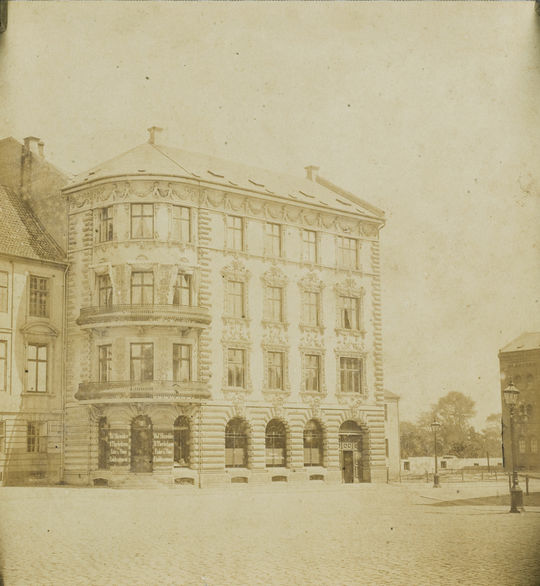
Brønnum House in the late 19th century

Brønnum House was the first residential building to be completed when the former naval dockyards at Gammelholm came under redevelopment in the 1860s. It was designed by Ferdinand Wilhelm Jensen and built in 1865-1866. The building was purchased by the broker Martin Henriques and the tobacco manufacturer Bernhard Hirschsprung who both lived in the building with their families for many years.

=== Hirschsprung, Henriques and Heine ===
Hirschsprung lived with his family on the second floor. Together with his brother, Heinrich Hirschsprung, he had taken over his father's tobacco company A.M. Hirschsprung & Sønner in 1959. In 1870, the company completed a new factory a little down the street at Tordenskioldsgade 7. Benrhard Hirschsprung's wife Emma was the daughter of Jacob Herman Bing. The couple had five children. Bernhard and Emma Hirschsrpung lived in the apartment until their death in 1909 and 1910.

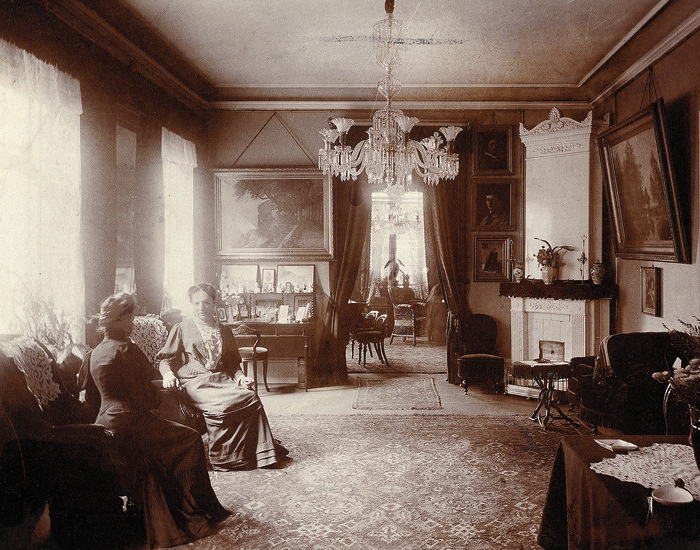
The Henrique family's living room on the first floor. The woman facing the camera is Anna Henriques.

Henriques and his wife Terese (née Abrahamson) lived on the first floor until their deaths in 1912 and 1882. The couple had six children. The daughter Marie Henriques would later become a painter. The couple were close friends of the writer Hans Christian Andersen to whom they had been introduced by ballet master August Bournonville. Martin R Henriques' sister Dorothea Melchior (1823-1885) and her husband Moritz G. Melchior were also among Andersen's closest friends. Other prominent cultural figures visited their home, including August Bournonville and the composers Niels W. Gade, J. P. E. Hartmann and Edvard Grieg. The plan was initially for Andersen to rent a couple of rooms in the large apartment, but the plans ended up being dropped, both due to disagreements regarding the rent and because Andersen wanted a room with a view of the square.

The Supreme Court attorney Nathan Heine and his wife Mathilde (née Trier) lived on the third floor from 1882 to 1914. Mathilde Heine (née Trier) and R., a Hirschspring (née Bing) were cousins.

=== Café Brønnum ===
Hofskrædder D. Therkelsens Enke & Søn was initially based on the ground floor of the building. In 1871 it was replaced by Emil Brønnum's conditorie. The café was popular with actors from the Royal Danish Theatre. It existed for more than 125 years. The premises were later used by the Royal Danish Theatre as a ticket office.

== Architecture ==
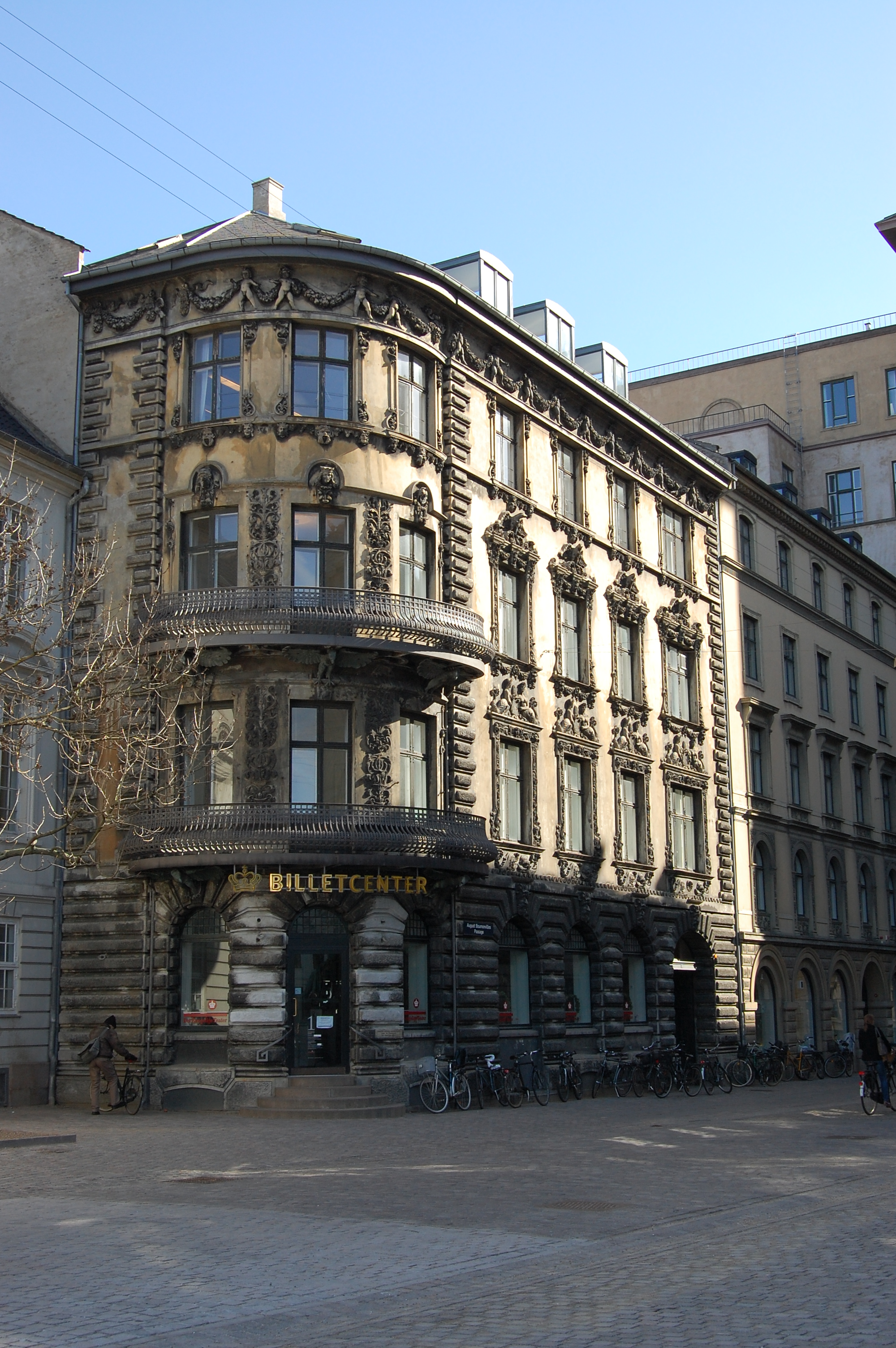
Brønnum House

The building is four storeys high and consists of four bays on Tordenskjoldsgade, a three-bay rounded corner and a half bay that connects the building to Harsdorff's House on Kongens Nytorv. The building surrounds three sides of a small courtyard which is closed to the south by a fire wall.

The external façade has rustication on the ground floor and rich stucco decorations on the upper floors. The keystones of the rounded openings are designed as grotesque masques. Other decorations include dolphins below the windows on the first floor, shields crowned by hives and held by mermaids above the windows on the first floor, and eagles above the windows on the second floor. The iron balconies on the rounded corner of the first and second floor are supported by flying eagles. Below the rain gutters is a frieze featuring putti holding a garland. A falling putto is seen in the bay furthest to the east. The figure was made to commemorate a worker who fell to his death under the construction of the building.

The apartment on the second floor features murals with scenes from Hirschsprung's country house painted by Thorvald Niss (1842-1905) and Gotfred Rump (1816–80). The living room features the original leather wallpaper with gilded detailing. An oval room is decorated with a golden Japanese Kinkarakami wallpaper.

== Today ==
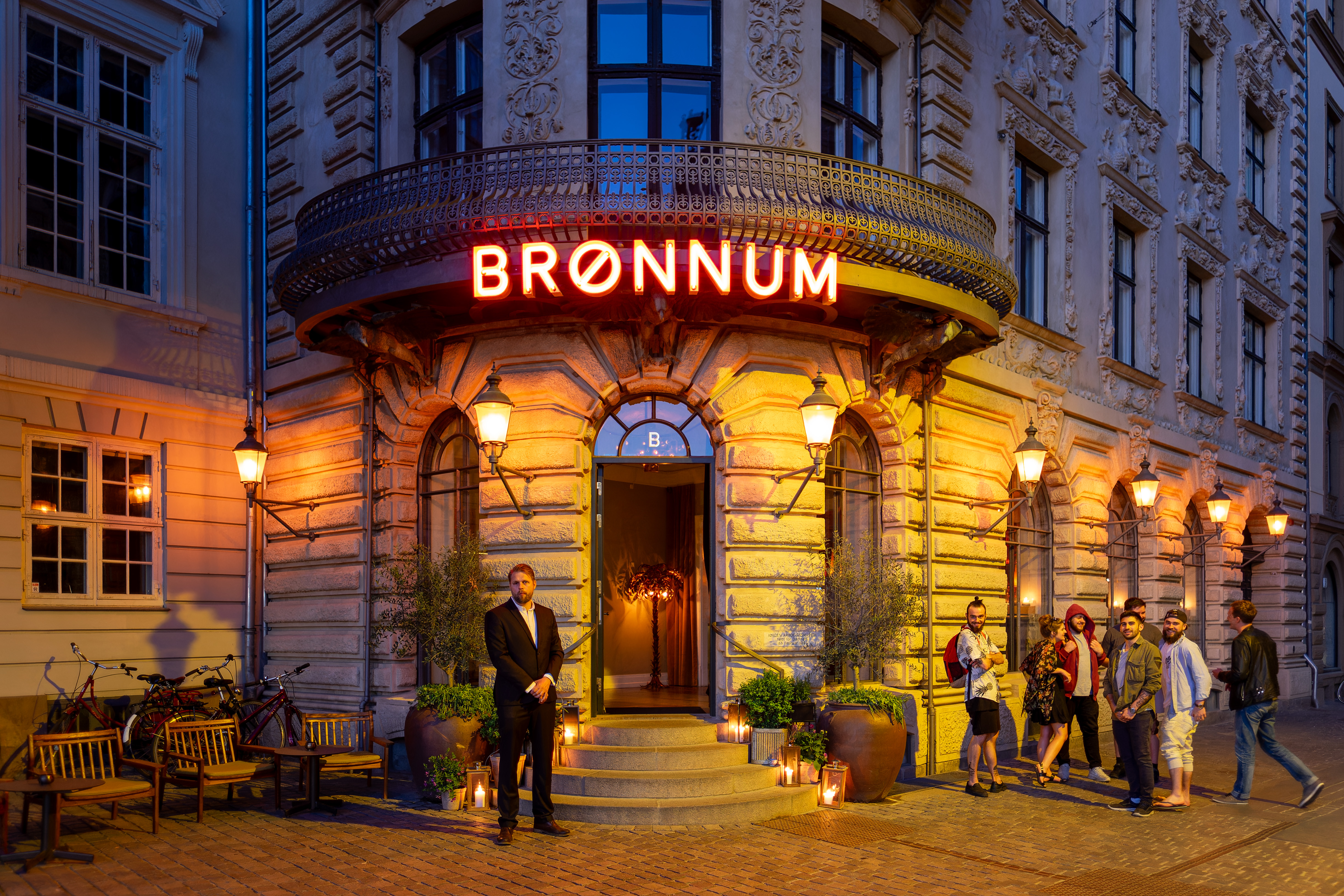
Brønnum in 2017

In 2014, Brønnum House was acquired by Karberghus and put through a major renovation. The building now houses a high-end office hotel (office club) with 140 workplaces on four floors. The offices are fully service. A cocktail bar opened on the ground floor in August 2016.

== In media and culture ==
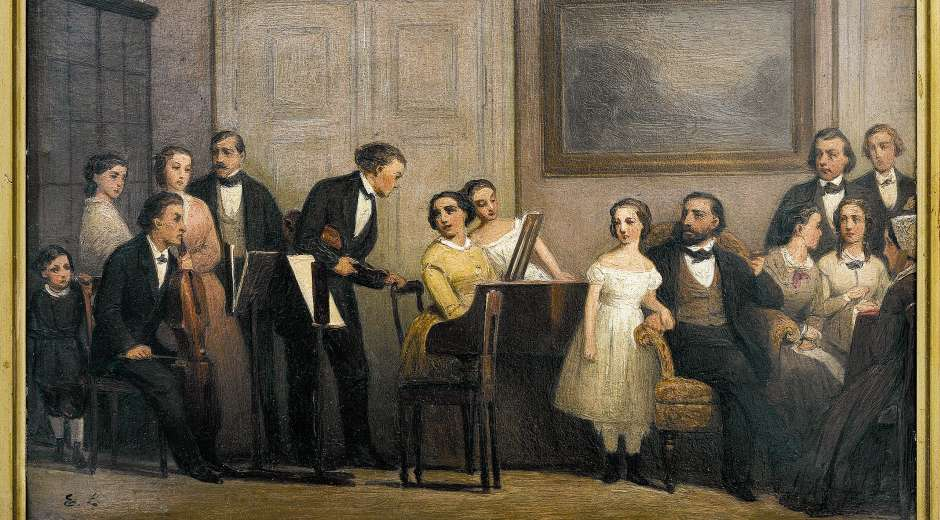
Edvard Lehmann: A music soirée inMartin Henriques' home at Tordenskjolsgade 1, 1868. Niels W. Gade is one of the people seen in the picture.

The Salomon family in Henrik Pontoppidan's Lykke-Per was possibly inspired by the Hirschsrpung family. Henrik Pondoppidan knew them personally.

The painter Edvard Lehmann created a painting of a music soirée in the Hneriques family's home. The people seen in the picture include the composer Niels W. Gade and the ballet dancer Juliette Price.

Elisabeth Hvidt (née Henriques), a granddaughter of Martin and Therese Henriques, described everyday life in the Henriques family's home on Kongens Nytorv in the 1983 book Kom Indenfor beskrevet livet på førstesalen.

== In popular culture ==
The Brønnum House is used as a location in the 1975 Danish comedy film Familien Gyldenkål.

== See also ==
- Søtorvet, Copenhagen
- Lihme House
- Moses Melchior
- List of streets in Copenhagen
