= Bespoke BBQ Company =

English barbecue manufacturer

Bespoke BBQ Company Ltd
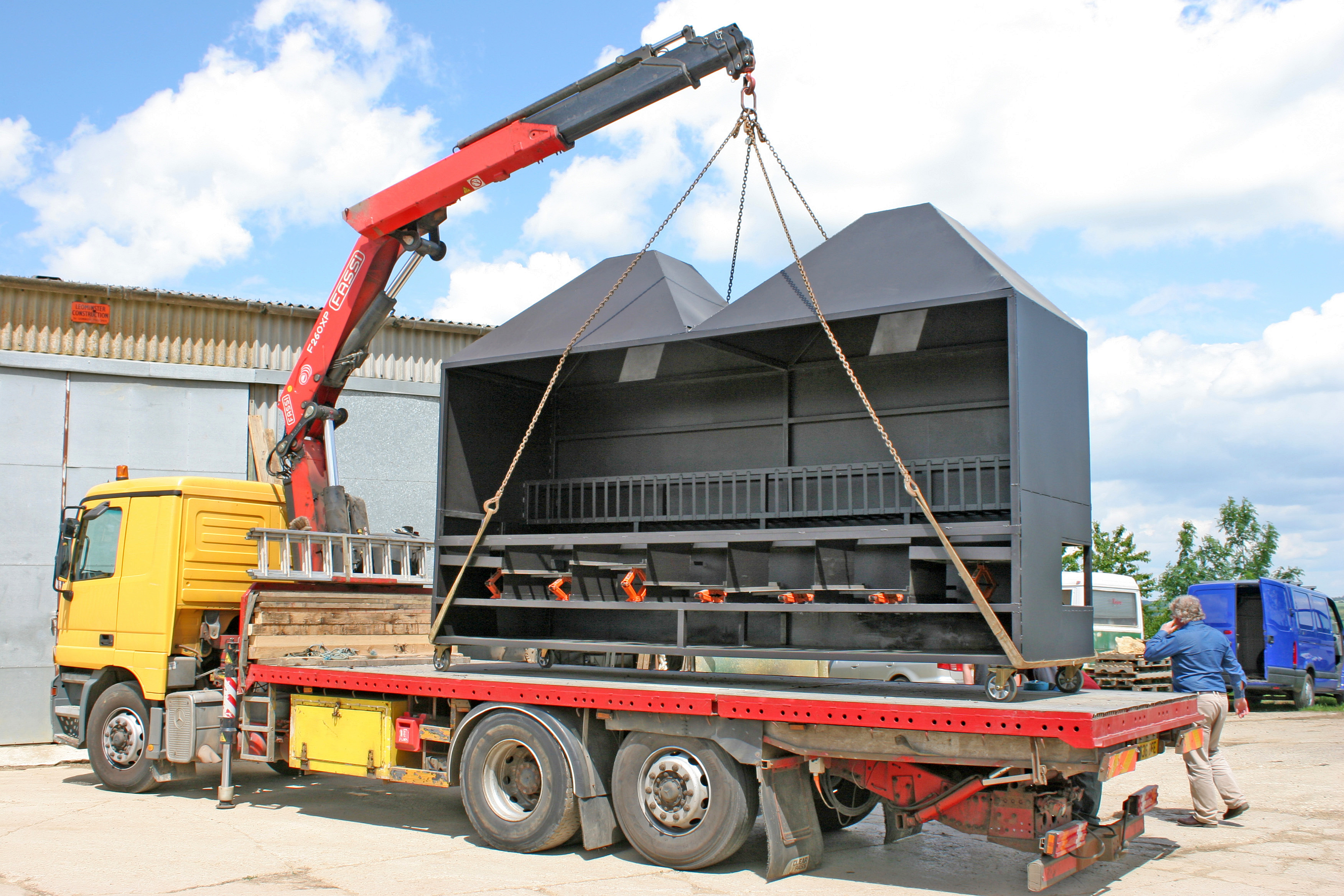
- The 'God-Grilla' custom barbecue
- Company type: Limited Company
- Industry: Catering, Engineering
- Founded: 2009
- Founder: Jack Henriques
- Headquarters: Gloucestershire, England, United Kingdom
- Area served: United Kingdom
- Products: Barbecue cookers
- Website: bespokebbqco.co.uk

Bespoke BBQ Company, based in Gloucestershire, England, is a company run by Jack Henriques that manufactures custom barbecues. It is the manufacturer of the God-Grilla.

The company was featured in the UK press in August 2010 when it unveiled a huge barbecue, dubbed by the press as 'God-Grilla', which weighed two tonnes, and required three operators to run at full capacity. It was constructed on the same principle as a smaller version. Together the two barbecues are known as the "Cripps Barn Models," after Cripps Catering who commissioned them both for their two wedding venues, named "Cripps Barn" and "Stone Barn," both located in the Cotswold District.
