= Frederiksholms Kanal 20 =

Building in Copenhagen, Denmark

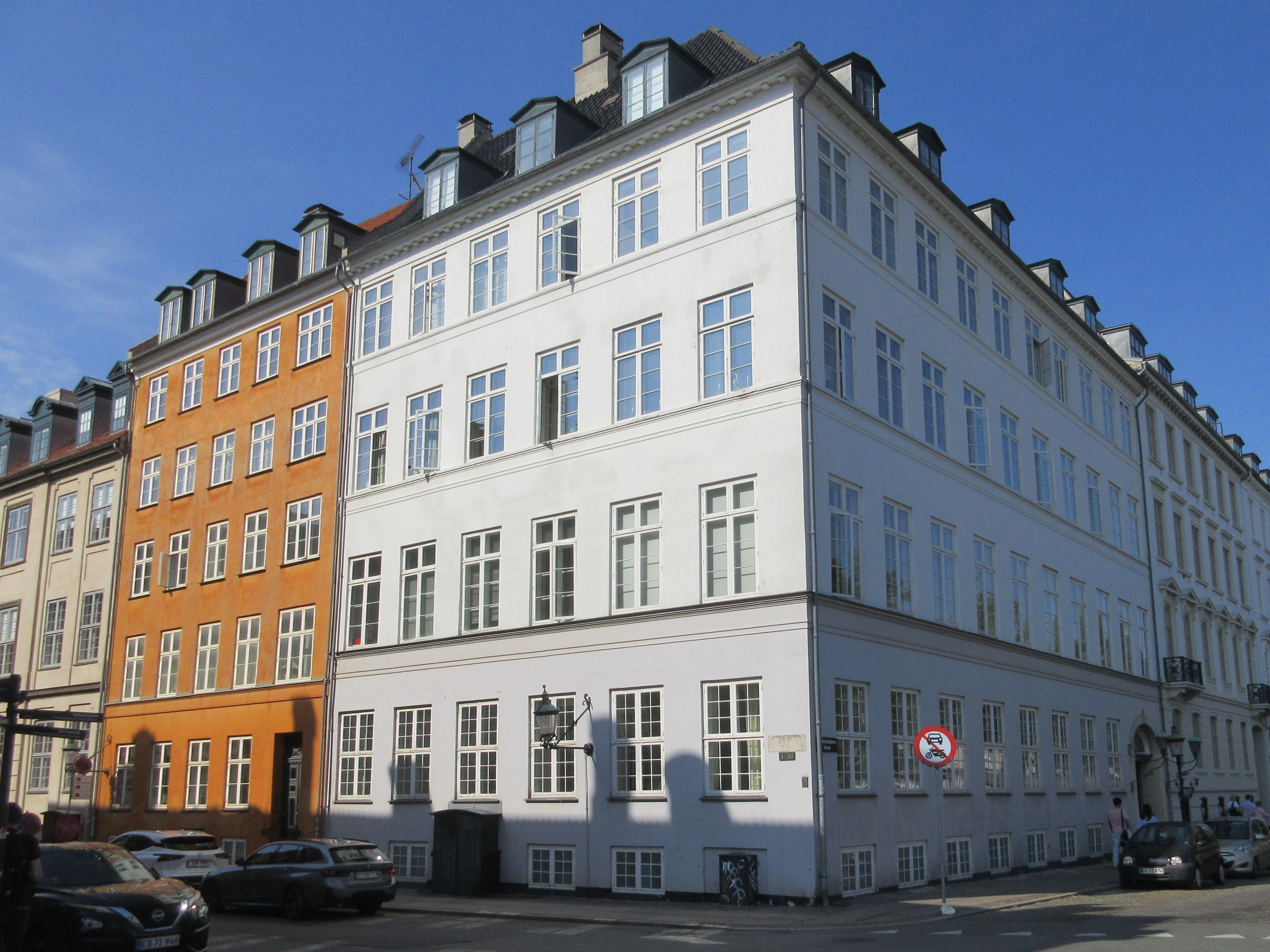
- The building in 2024.
- Interactive map of the Frederiksholms Kanal 20 area

General information
- Location: Copenhagen, Denmark
- Coordinates: 55°40′27.14″N 12°34′37.21″E

Frederiksholms Kanal 20, located at the corner with Ny Kongensgade (No. 2), is a mid-19th century apartment building overlooking Frederiksholms Kanal in central Copenhagen, Denmark. Its current appearance dates from 1848 when a building from before 1750 was heightened with two floors. The neighbouring building at Ny Kongensgade 4 and a three-storey warehouse in the courtyard were also built at this point. All three buildings were listed on the Danish registry of protected buildings and places in 1959.

== History ==
=== 17th century ===
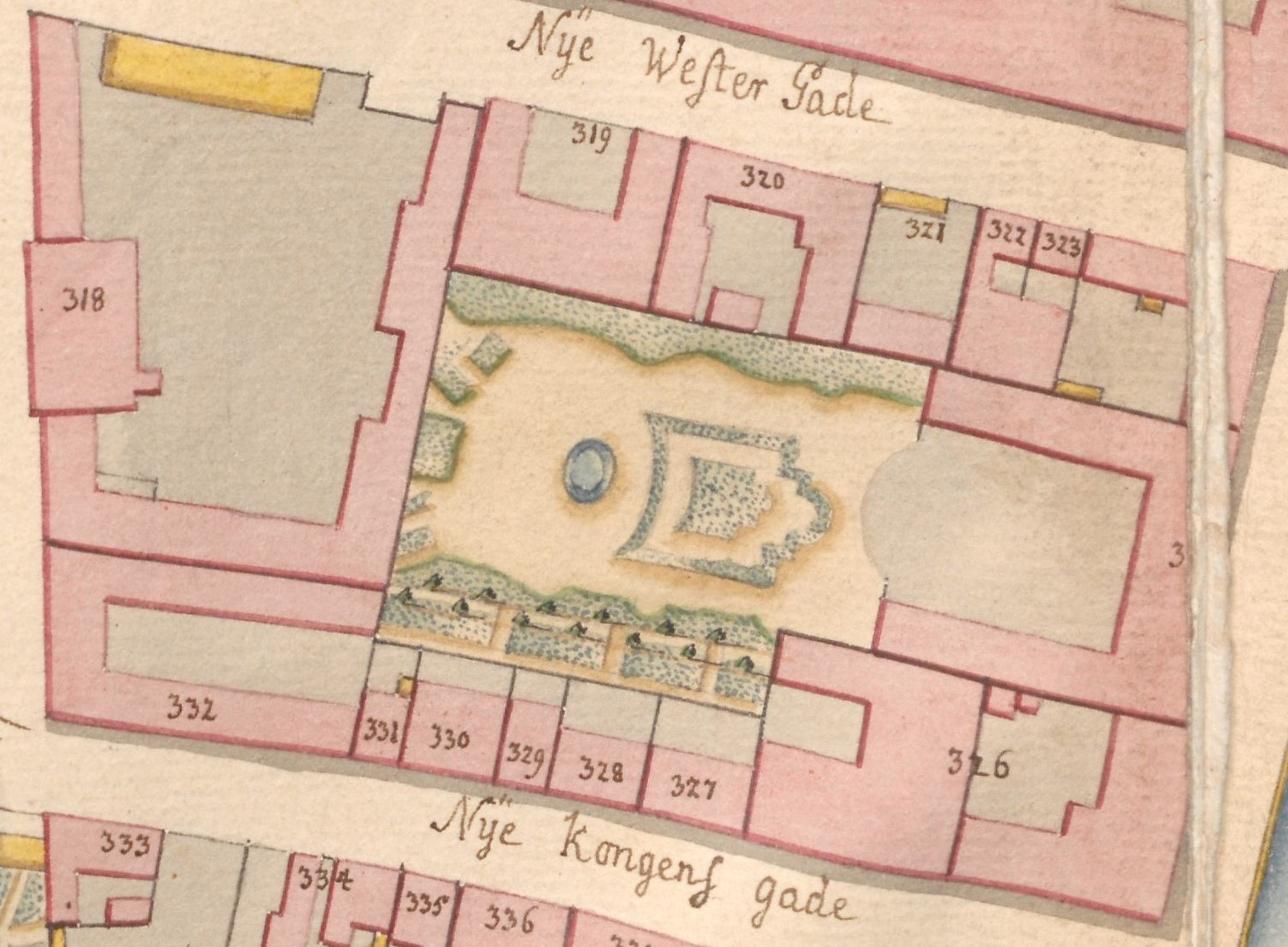
No. 326 seen on a detail from Christian Gedde's map of Copenhagen's West Quarter, 1757.

The corner property was listed in Copenhagen's first cadastre of 1689 as No. 286 in the city's West Quarter, owned by one Johan Jørgen. A two-storey building was built at the site before 1750.

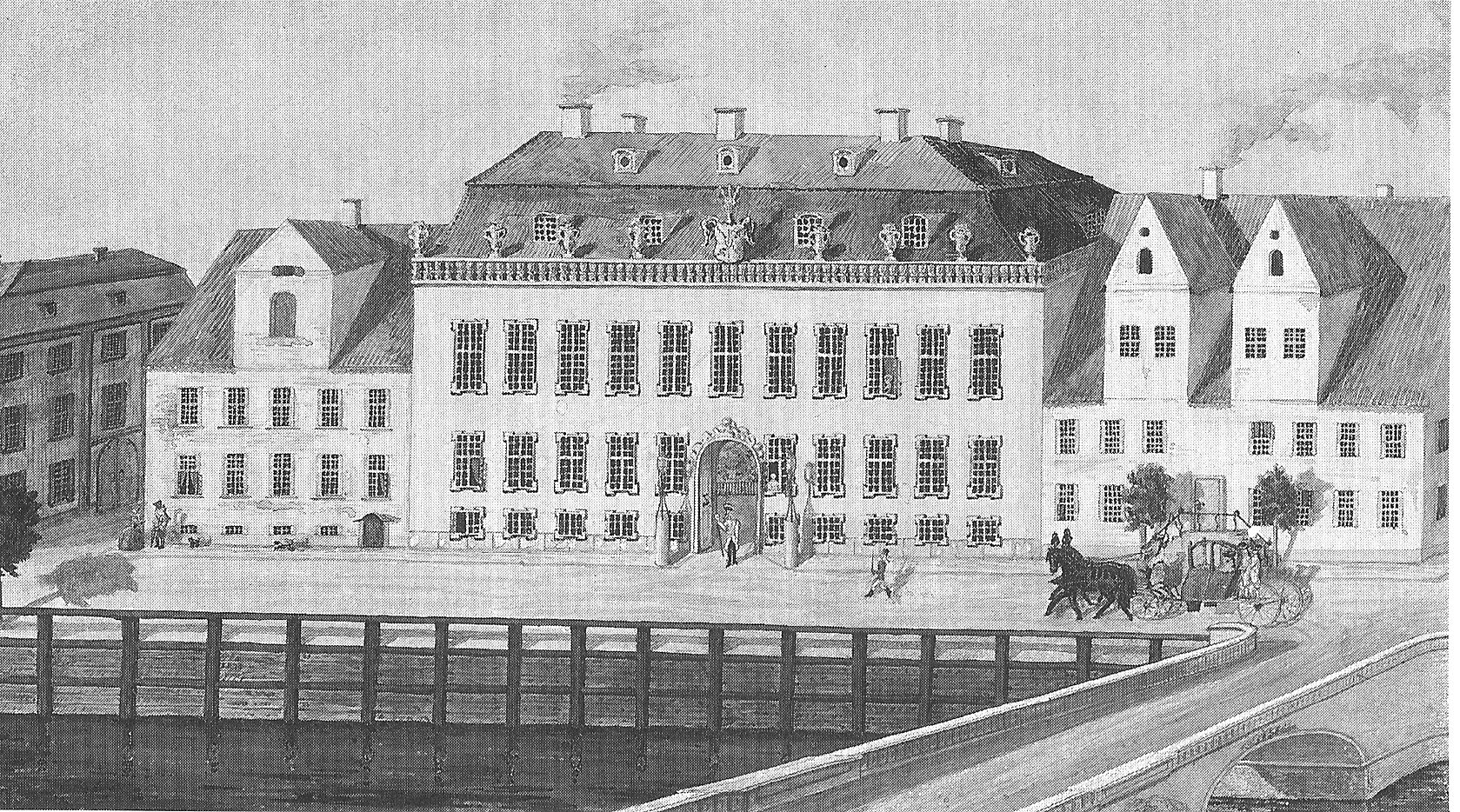
The building seen furthest to the left

The property was listed in the new cadastre of 1756 as No. 326. It belonged to etatsråd Johan Frederik Friis at that time. The property was later divided into two smaller properties. The corner property was from then on initially referred to as No. 326A.

=== 1800–1848 ===
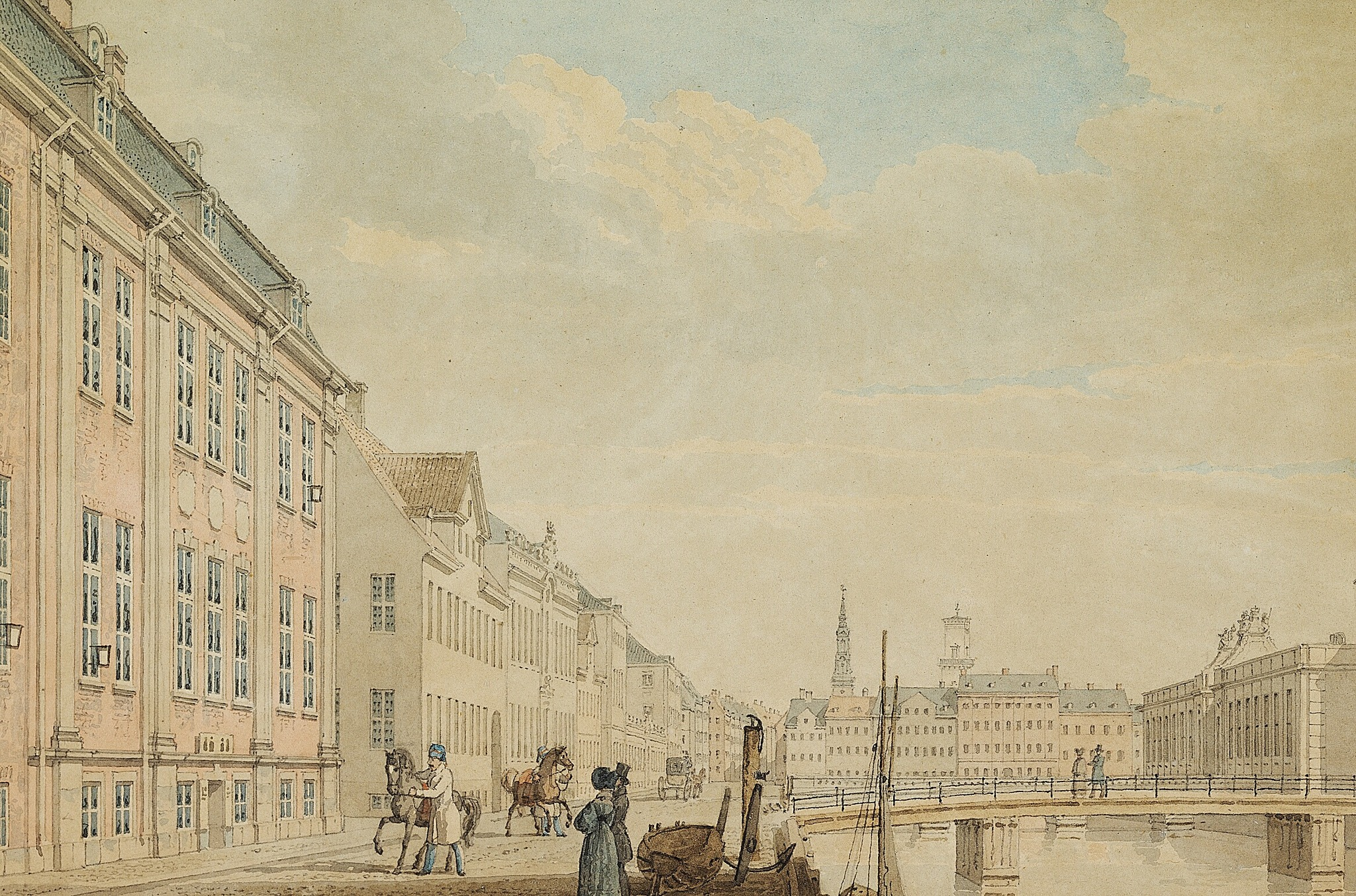
The building seen on a watercolour by H.G.F. Holm.

The corner property was listed in the new cadastre of 1806 as No. 243 in the West Quarter. It belonged to senior clerk (kontorchef) in Rentekammeret Arnold de Fine Skibsted (1785–1851) at that time.

Johan Ludvig Heiberg was a resident in the building in 1827. Supreme Court attorney and politician Orla Lehmann lived there in 1845–46.

=== The 1843 transformation and later history ===
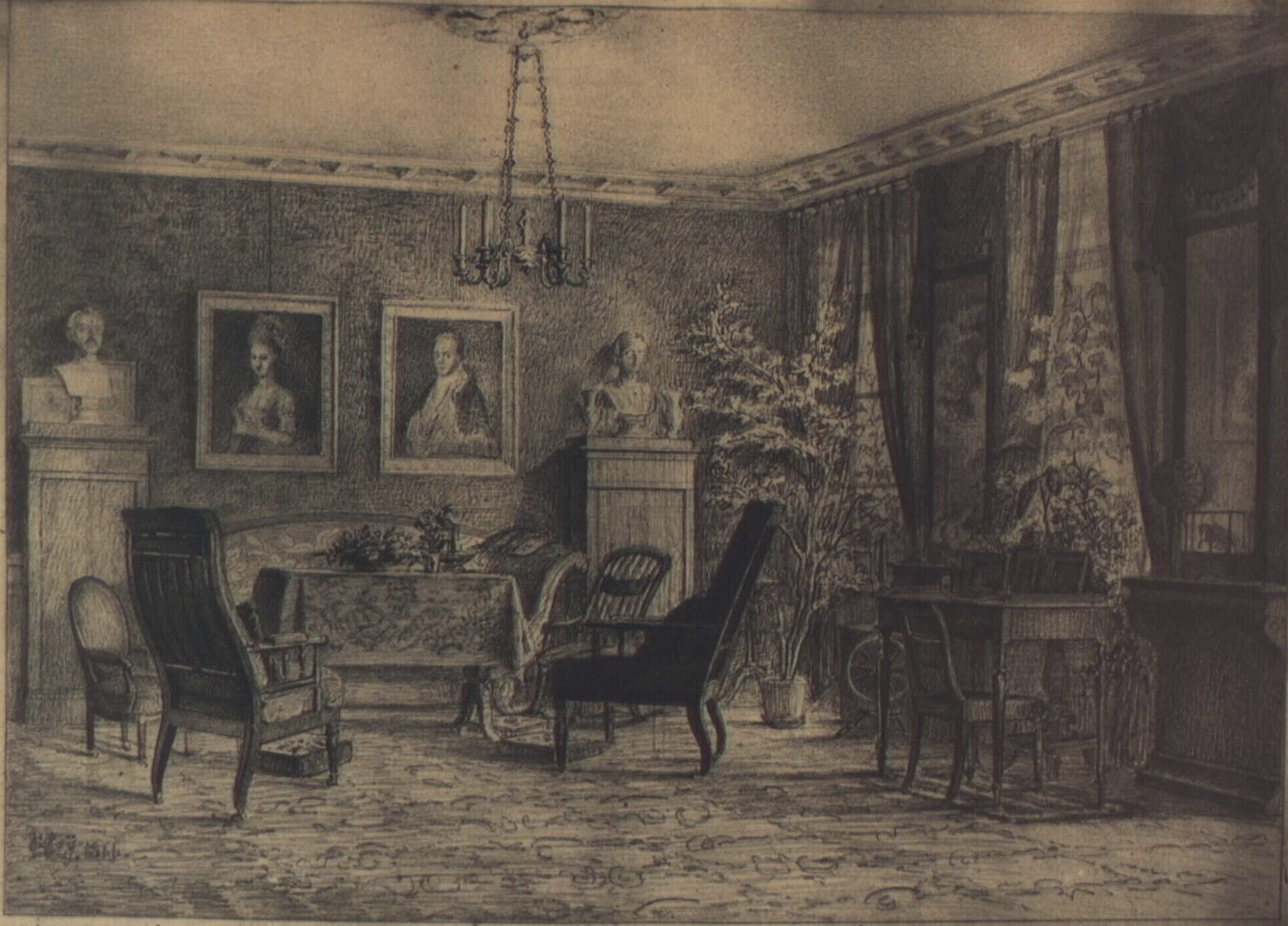
Ernst Poul Bruhn's living room, 1866..

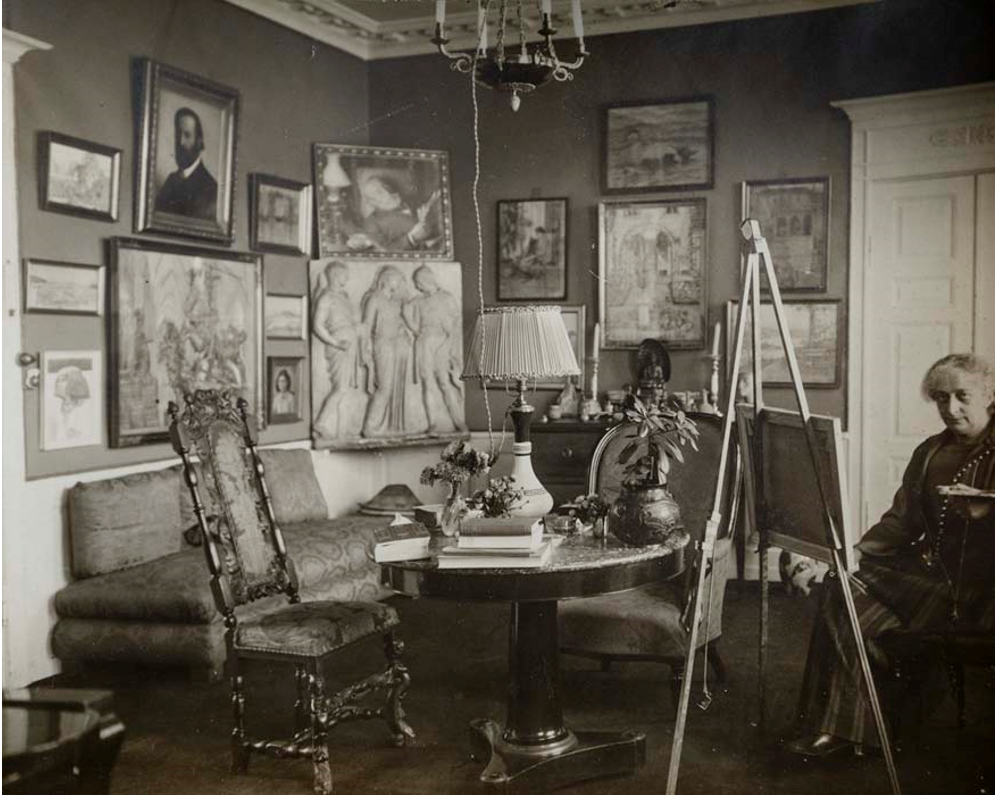
Marie Henriques in her apartment

In 1848, No. 243 was divided into No. 243A (now Frederiksholms Kanal 20) and No. 243 B (now Ny Kongensgade 4). The two-storey corner building was at the same time adapted and heightened with two floors. The architect of the adaption is not known. No. 243 was used for the construction of a new building by oine wholesale merchant (grosserer) Harboe.

The corner building No. 243A was listed as Frederiksholms Kanal 20/Ny Kongensgade 2 when house numbering (by street) was introduced as a supplement to the old cadastral numbers, by quarter in 1758. No. 243B was listed as Ny Kongensgade 4.

Ernst Poul Bruhn, an army officer with rank of General-Lieutenant, resided in the building in the 1860s.

The painter Carl Bloch resided in one of the third-floor apartments from 1882 to 1887. He lived there with his wife Alma Bloch Født Trepka, their eight children (aged one to 15) and four maids at the time of the 1885 census.

The painter Marie Henriques lived on the third floor. In October 1943, she had to flee her home to escape arrest by the Gestapo.

== Architecture ==
The building consists of four storeys over a high cellar. The facade towards Frederiksholms Kanal is 10 bays long while six bays faces Ny Kongensgade. The roof is clad with black-glazed tiles and features five dormers towards the canal. The building at Ny Kongensgade 5 is five bays wide. In the courtyard is a three-storey warehouse. All three buildings were listed on the Danish registry of protected buildings and places on 6 April 1959.

== Today ==
Lead Rödl & Partner, a law firm founded in 2011, is based in the building.
