= Martin Henriques =

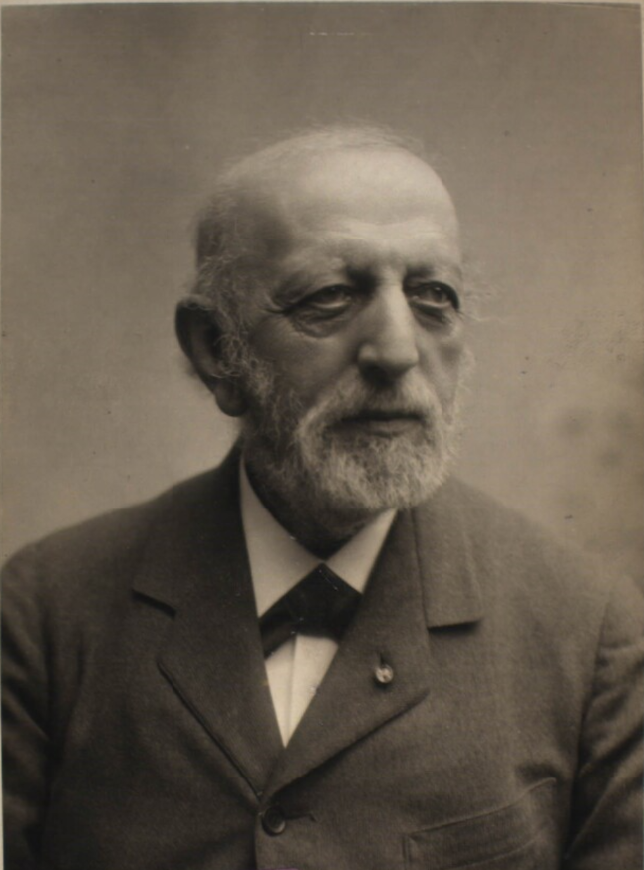
- Born: Marcus Ruben Henriques; 26 December 1825; Copenhagen, Denmark
- Died: 25 June 1912 (aged 86); Copenhagen, Denmark
- Occupation: Businessman

Marcus Ruben Henriques, commonly known as Martin (R.) Henriques (26 December 1825 – 25 June 1912) was a Jewish-Danish businessman. He was the father of the musician and editor Robert Henriques and the painter Marie Henriques.

== Early life and career ==
Martin Henriques was born in Copenhagen as one of 18 children of the wealthy banker Ruben Henriques and his second wife Jeruchim-Jorika Henriques.

His father had founded the brokerage firm R. Henriques jr. in 1801. Martin Henriques and his brother Aron Henriques took over the company in 1851. The company was based on Amagertorv.

== Family and property ==
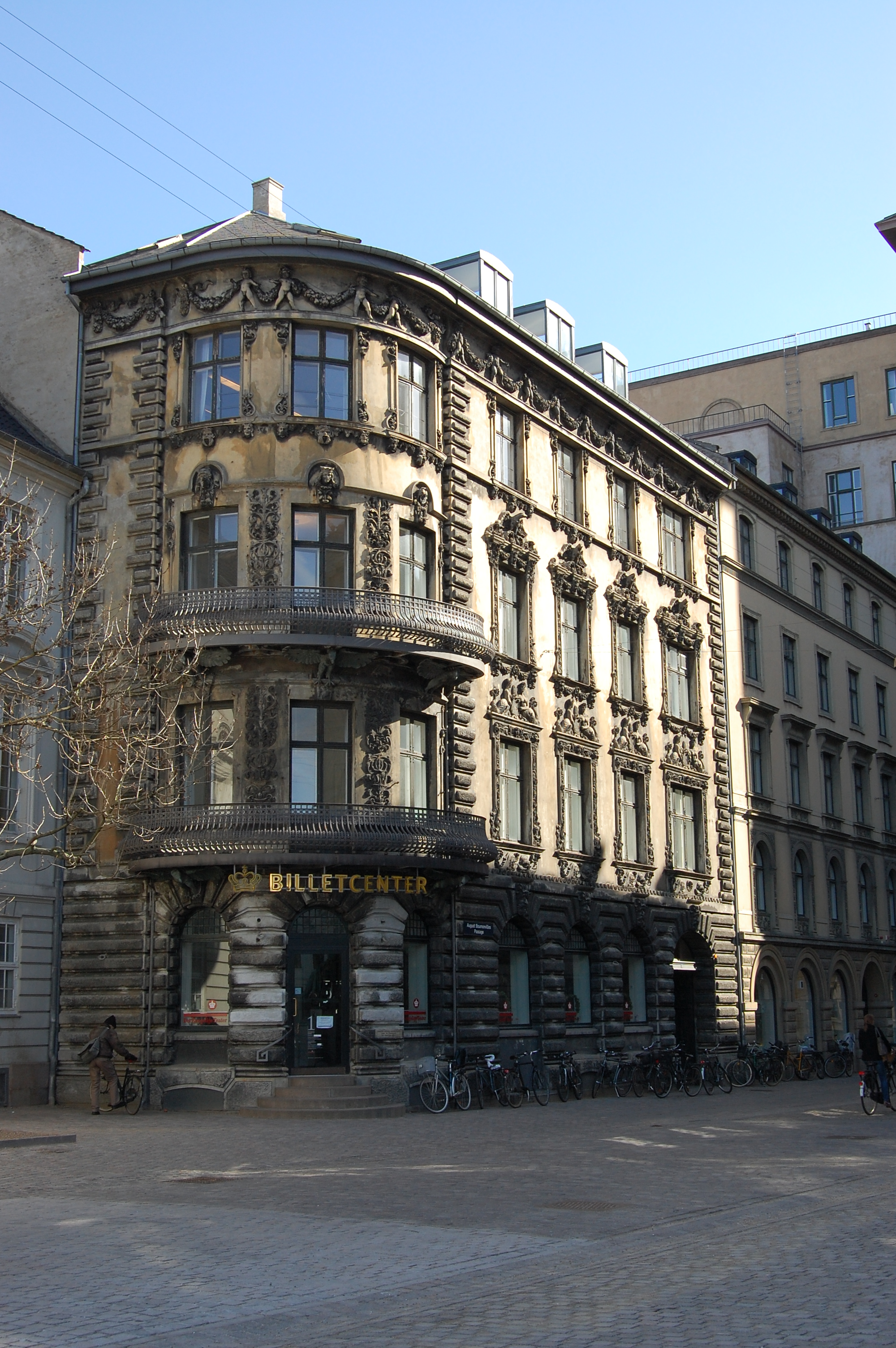
Brønnum House

Henriques married Therese Abrahamson in November 1854, the daughter of Salomon Abrahamson, a Jewish merchant in Rødby on the island of Falster. Her wealthy maternal aunt had brought her to Copenhagen at an early age. She was a talented pianist. The couple had five children. Four of them, the daughters Anna and Fernanda and sons Robert and Edmond, were born within a period of just four and a half years. The daughter Marie Henriques was born six years later.

The family initially lived at Amagertorv 17. In 1865, Henriques and Hirschsprung purchased the property at Tordenskjoldsgade 1 in the fashionable new Gammelholm neighbourhood. The Henriques family lived on the first floor while the Hirschsprung family lived on the second floor. Henriques was also the owner of the country house Petershøj in Klampenborg, north of Copenhagen.

== Cultural associations ==
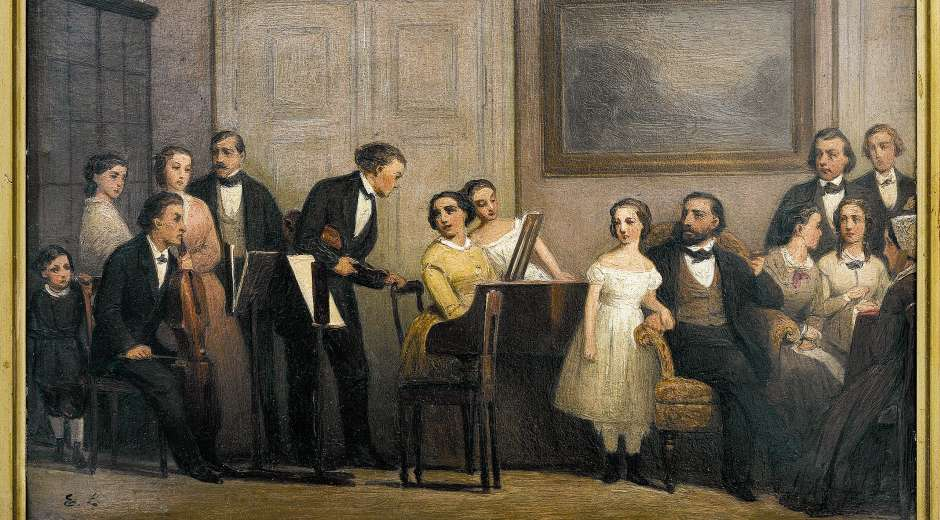
Edvard Lehmann: A music soirée in Martin Henriques' home at Tordenskjolsgade 1, 1868. Niels W. Gade is one of the people seen in the picture

Many prominent cultural figures frequented the Henriques home at Gammelholm. The family was particularly fond of music and their guests included the ballet master August Bournonville and the composers Niels W. Gade, J. P. E. Hartmann and Edvard Grieg. The painter Carl Bloch was another frequent guest and many of his paintings hang on the walls.

The family was also among the closest friends of the writer Hans Christian Andersen who had been introduced to the family by Bournonville. Martin Henriques' sister Dorothea Melchior (1823–1885) and her husband Moritz G. Melchior were also among Andersen's closest friends.
