= Nathan Heine =

Danish lawyer

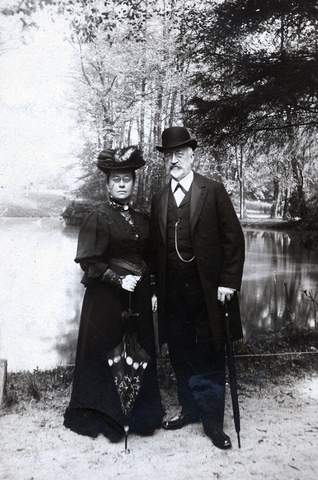
Nathan and Mathilde Heine

Nathan Heine (15 March 1835 – 11 December 1914) was a Danish lawyer. The street Heinesgade in the Nørrebro district of Copenhagen is named after him.

== Early life and education ==
Heine was born into a wealthy Jewish family in Hamburg, the son of Levy Heine and Emma née Berend. The family moved to Copenhagen when he was three years old. He attended Borgerdyd School in Christianshavn, matriculating in 1854. He then enrolled at the University of Copenhagen from which he graduated with a Candidate of Law degree in 1862.

== Career ==
Following graduation, from 11 January 1864 until 12 January 1865, Heine worked as an assistant solicitor for Simonsen, and then from 13 July 1868 for Overretsprokurator Kalko. On 27 July 1870, he was licensed as an overretssagfører and started his own law firm. He was a board member of A/S Københavns private Laanebank. Formd.

== Personal life ==
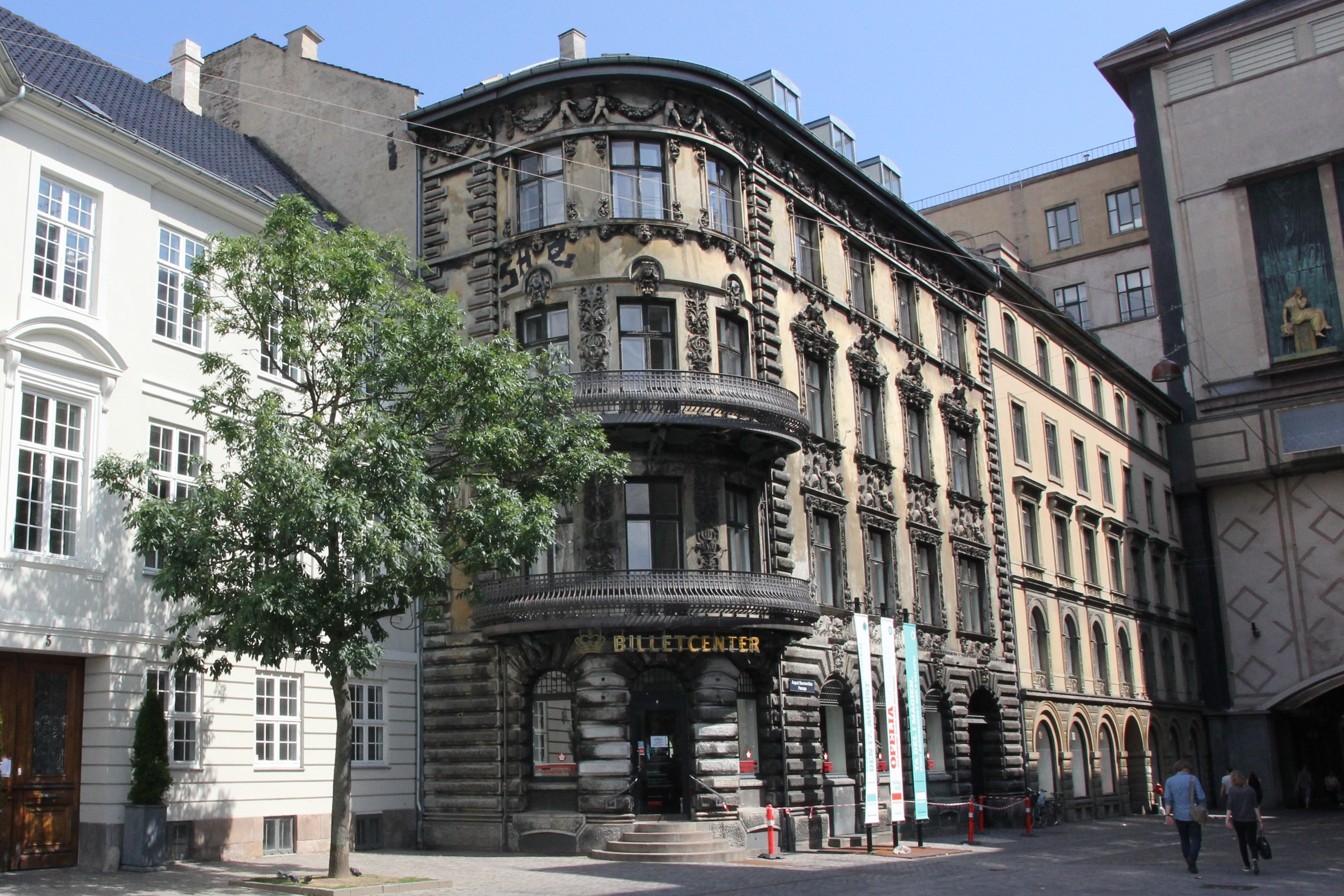
The Brønnum House in Copenhagen

On 15 April, 1866, Heine married Mathilde Henriette Trier (1843–1912), daughter of businessman Adolph Meyer Trier and Sophie née Bing. They resided on the third floor of the Brønnum House on Kongens Nytorv from 1882 until his death. He was the father of lawyer Laurits Heine and the father-in-law of lawyer Johan Ludvig Nathansen.

He was chairman of the Jewish Burial Society of 1719 (det mosaiske Begravelsesselskab af 1810) and a board member of Ristings Huslejelegat (until 1905). On his 70th birthday, he created N. Heine's Grant, administrated by the Danish Lawyers Society' Support Foundation.

He died on 11 December 1914 and was given a burial at the Jewish Western Cemetery. The street Heinesgade in Nørrebro was named after him in 1904.
