= Marie Henriques =

Danish painter

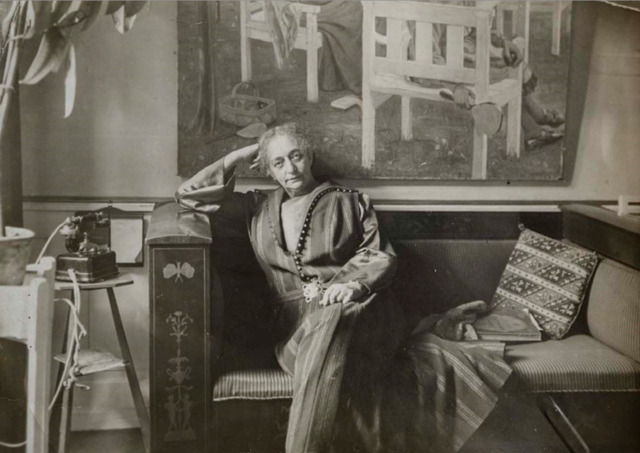
Marie Henriques.

Marie Henriques (26 June 1866 – 12 January 1944) was a Danish painter who created landscapes, figure paintings and portraits, initially in the Realist style but increasingly under the influence of Impressionism. She also painted watercolours of ancient architecture and sculpture. In 1916, she was a founding member of the Society of Women Artists (Kvindelige Kunstneres Samfund).

== Early life and education ==
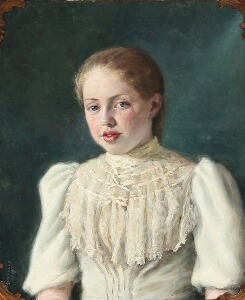
Young girl in a white dress (1893)

Born into the wealthy Danish-Jewish Henriques family in Copenhagen, Marie Henriques was the daughter of Martin Henriques (1825-1912) and Therese Abrahamsen (1833-1882) a pianist. The family shared their time between their first-floor apartment in the Brønnum House on Kongens Nytorv and the country house Petershøj in Klampenborg. She shared her artistic talents with her paternal uncles and with her elder brother, Robert Henriques (1858-1914), a musician and writer. After taking private painting lessons in Denmark, she spent six months with her father in Paris where she studied under the Belgian Alfred Stevens, the Norwegian Christian Krohg and the French artist Othon Friesz. On returning to Copenhagen, she was fortunate to be able to attend the Women's School which had just been established at the Royal Danish Academy of Fine Arts. She studied there under Viggo Johansen, graduating in 1893.

== Career ==
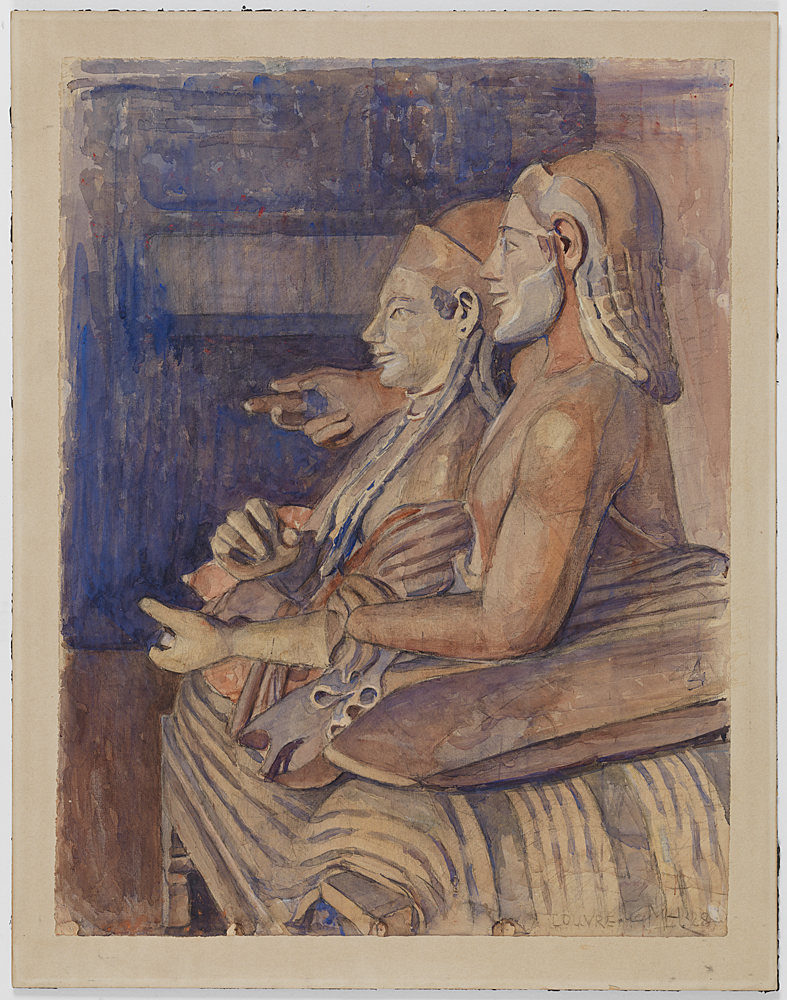
Etruscan sarcophagus (1928)

Henriques, who had travelled frequently as a child, later also visited Italy, Spain, North Africa, England, the Netherlands, Belgium, Sweden and Egypt. Of particular note were her stays in Greece where she spent long periods from 1910 to 1913. Both at home and abroad, she exhibited watercolours and oils depicting scenes from her travels.

Henrigues' early work was in the Realist style but during her stay in Paris it became increasingly Impressionist. A visitor to Skagen, she appears to have been inspired by the work of Anna Ancher. She later created coloured lithographs of architectural scenes in Denmark and Greece as well as woodcuts of ancient Greek, Egyptian, Etruscan and Roman art. Many of her architectural and archaeological works were acquired by the Department of Archaeology and Ethnology of the University of Copenhagen.

In 1916, Henriques was a founding member of the Society of Women Artists (Kvindelige Kunstneres Samfund) where she served on the board until 1935. In the 1930s, she was also a member of the Royal Academy's Council and of the board of the Kunstforeningen Art Society. In 1934, she was awarded the Tagea Brandt Rejselegat.

== Personal life ==
Henriques never married and had no children. She lived on the second floor at Frederiksholms Kanal 20 in Copenhagen. In October 1943, she had to flee her apartment to escape the Gestapo. She was hiding at the Montebello Sanatorium in Helsingør where she died. She was buried in the Mosaisk Vestre Jewish Cemetery in Copenhagen.

The author Hans Christian Andersen was a close friend of the Henriques family. He created a picture book for her when she was three years old. In 2017, it was sold at auction at DKK 2.9 million.
