= Sally Henriques =

Danish painter

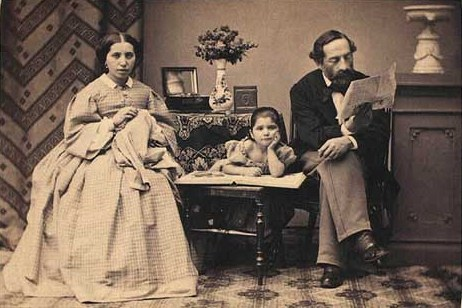
Sally Henriques with his wife Rose and daughter Jorikka (1860s)

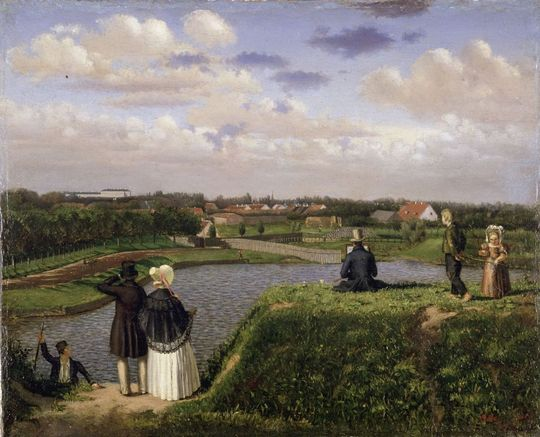
View from the Western Rampart; Holcks Bastion, 1844

Sally (Salomon) Ruben Henriques (14 November 1815 – 29 April 1886) was a Danish painter. He was born and died in Copenhagen and portrayed the city in his pictures.

== Biography ==
Sally Henriques was born on 14 November 1815 into a Jewish family. His parents were Ruben Henriques, a merchant and stock broker, and Jorika (Jeruchim) Melchior. Twenty years old, after three years of training in a business office, he decided to pursuit a career in painting. His two younger brothers, Samuel and Nathan, also painted. He was accepted into the Royal Danish Academy of Fine Arts in 1836 with a letter of recommendation from Gustav Friedrich Hetsch, a leading architect of the time, and in 1837 he advanced to the Model School but never attended. Instead he studied at the private painting schools of Christoffer Wilhelm Eckersberg and J. L. Lund.

He exhibited at Charlottenborg between 1840 and 1844 and various other exhibitions around Copenhagen but never achieved commercial success as a painter. Instead he set up a business as a house painter and decorator before taking over an antique shop after his brother Samuel in 1849.

== See also ==
- Art of Denmark
