= Edvard Lehmann =

Danish painter, illustrator and lithographer

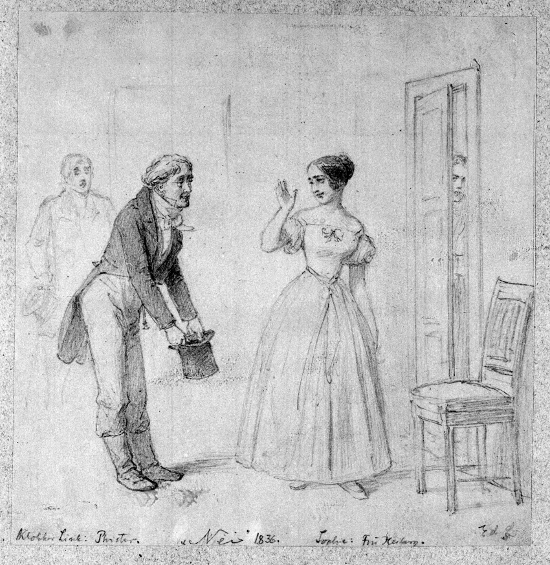
Johanne louise Heiberg and Ludvig Phister in Johan Ludvig Heiberg's play No at the Royal Danish Theatre, 1937

Edvard Lehmann (1815-1892) was a Danish painter, illustrator and lithographer who is mainly remembered for his work as a theatre painter. His drawings and watercolours are an important source of knowledge about Danish theatre during the Danish Golden Age.

== Biography ==
Lehmann was born in Copenhagen on 20 January 1815, the son of miniature painter Johan Peter Christian Lehmann and Johanne Lassen. He never married and left no children.

Lehmann studied at the Royal Danish Academy of Fine Arts from 1828. He worked at the Royal Danish Theatre as a costume draughtsman c. 1840-70, collaborating with August Bournonville.

Lehmann was also active as a portraitist and painted humorous genre paintings of street life in Copenhagen.

== Exhibitions ==
As of 1994 Lehmann's work had been exhibited at:

- Charlottenborg Spring Exhibition, Copenhagen ( 1829, 1931–34, 1836–58, 1867–69, 1876, 1878–81, 1885)
- Royal Academy of Fine Arts, Stockholm (1850)
- Nordic Art Exhibition, Copenhagen (1872)
- Rgeatre Exhibition, Copenhagen (1898)
- City Hall Exhibition, Copenhagen (1901)
- Danish Jewish Artists, Kunstforeningen, Copenhagen (1908)
- My Best Artwork, Statens Museum for Kunst, Copenhagen (1941)
- Kunstnerforen. af 18. Nov., Copenhagen (1942)
- Arte danese, Palazzo Braschi, Rome (1974)
- De ukendte guldaldermalere, Kunstforeninge, Copenhagen (1982)
- C.W. Eckersberg and His Students, Statens Museum for Kunst, Copenhagen (1983)
- Inden for murene, Kunstforeneningen, Copenhagen (1984)

== Gallery ==
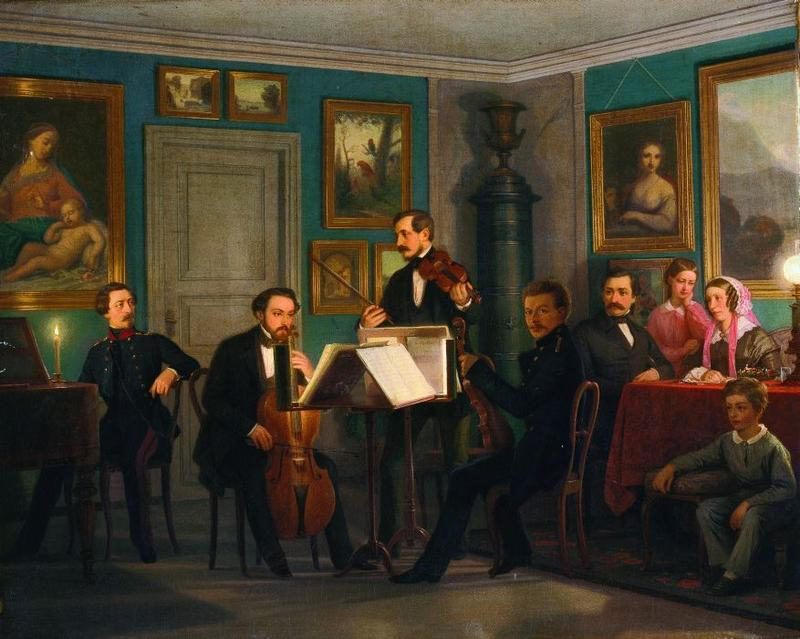
The Waagepetersen Family Portrait (c. 1856)

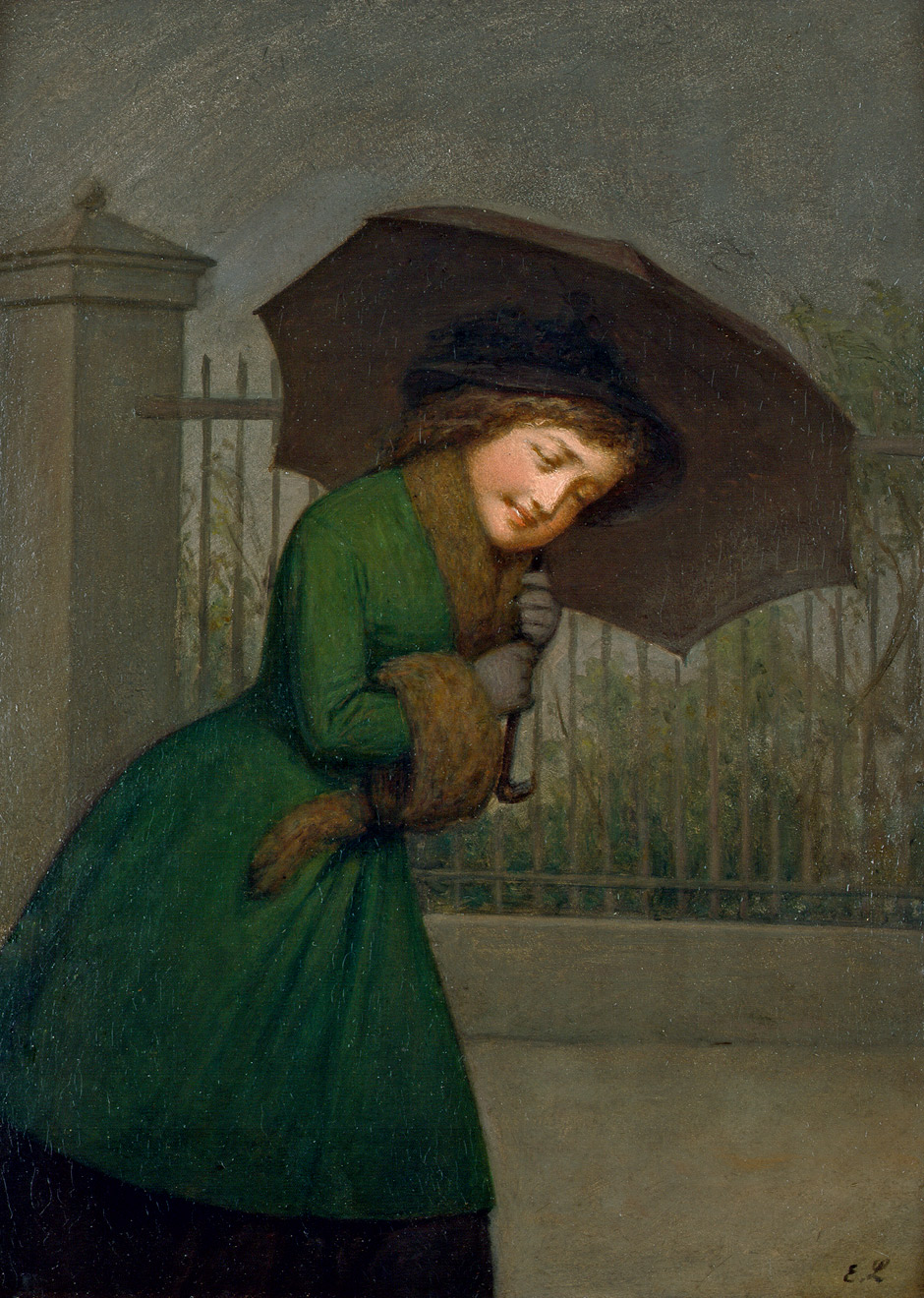
Girl With Unbrella

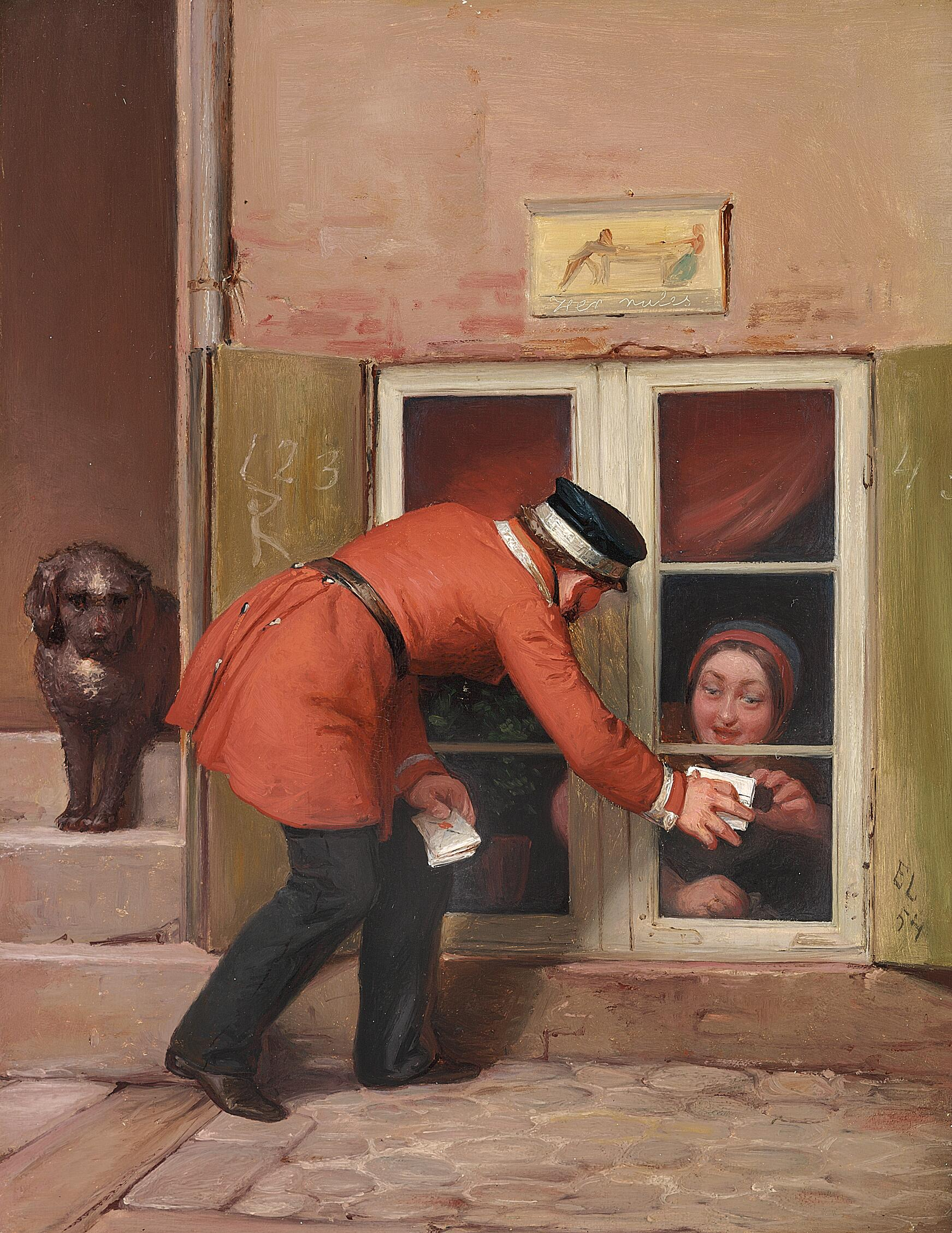
Mailman Delivering A Letter Through A Cellar Window

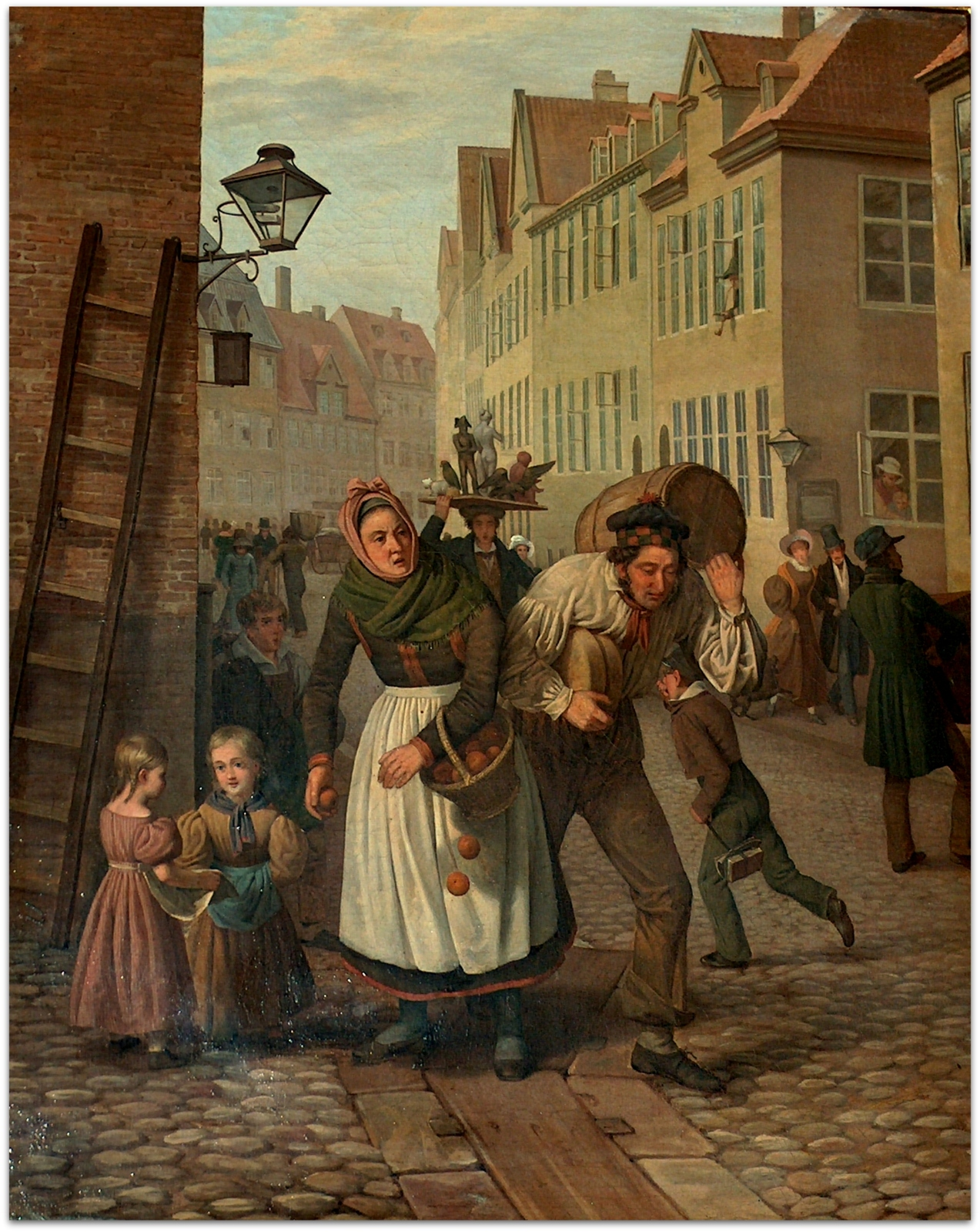
Scene From Magstræde in Copenhagen
