= Købmagergade 36 =

Historic building in Copenhagen, Denmark

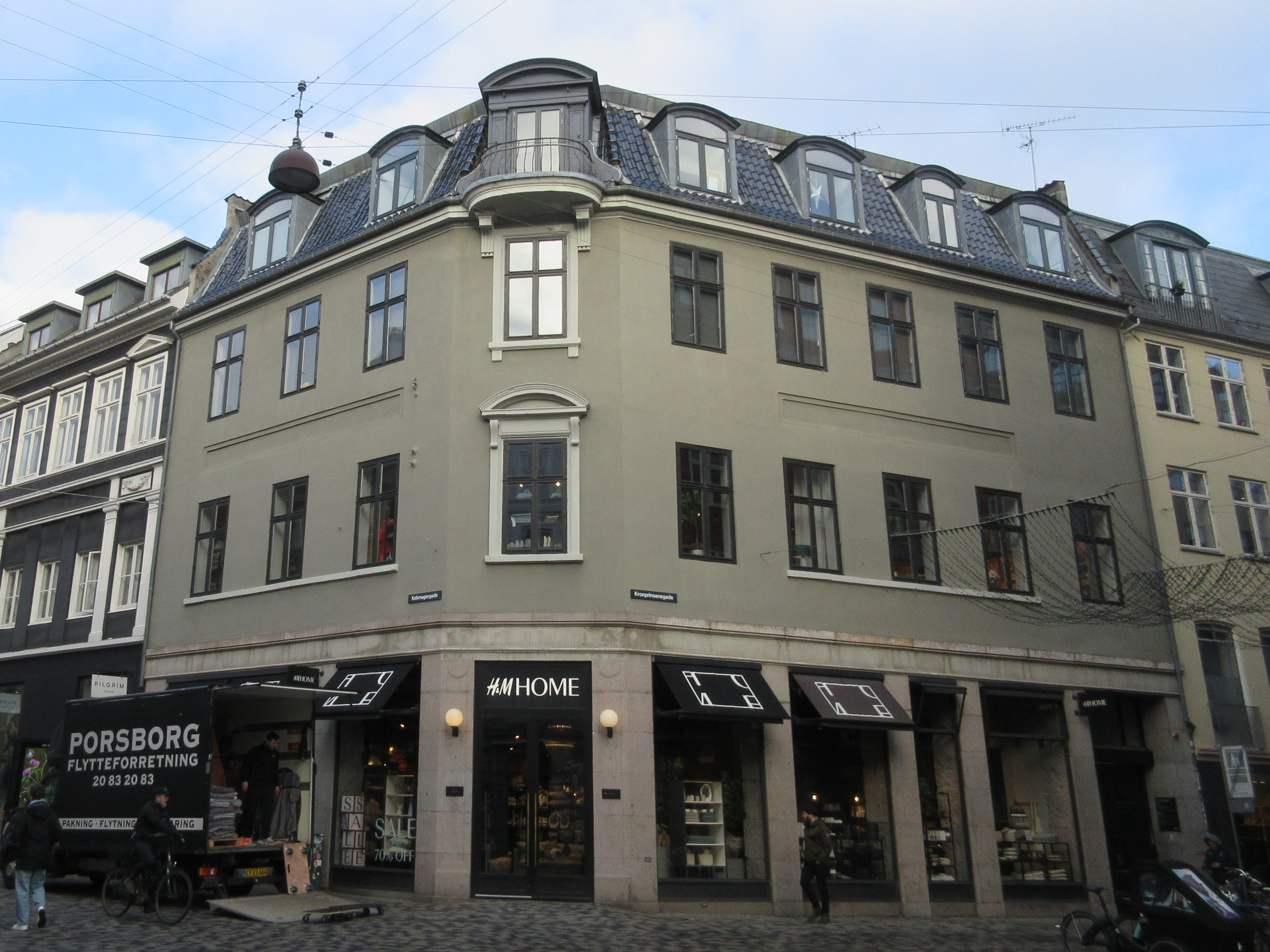
- Interactive map of the Købmagergade 36 area

General information
- Location: Copenhagen, Denmark
- Coordinates: 55°40′50.0″N 12°34′42.3″E
- Completed: 1795

Købmagergade 36/Kronprinsensgade 1 is a Neoclassical building situated at the corner of the shopping street Købmagergade and Kronprinsensgade in central Copenhagen, Denmark. Constructed for director of the Royal Greenland Trade Department Hartvig Marcus Frisch in 1795, some ten years after Kronprinsessegade was established at private initiative by Johan Peter Boye Junge, a master builder and head of Copenhagen Fire Corps, it was shortly thereafter sold to the wealthy widow Cecilie Rosted (née Rohde), who kept it until her death. From 1826 to 2003, it was then home to the Royal Military and Vajsenhus Pharmacy (Danish: Det Kgl. Militære og Vajsenhus Apotek). The pharmacy is now located at nearby Landemærket 1–3. Other notable former residents of the building include the painter Vilhelm Groth.

== History ==
=== Site history, 1689–1795 ===
Back in the 17th century, the site was made up of two smaller properties. One of them was listed in Copenhagen's first cadastre from 1689 as No. 11 in Købmager Quarter, owned by Ditlev Brashagen. The other one was listed as No. 12, owned by vintner Hans Henrik. They were later merged with a much larger property owned by Conrad von Reventlow (1644–1708). After his death in 1708, the property was passed to his son Christian Detlev Reventlow (1671–1738). The buildings were destroyed in the Copenhagen Fire of 1728 but subsequently rebuilt.

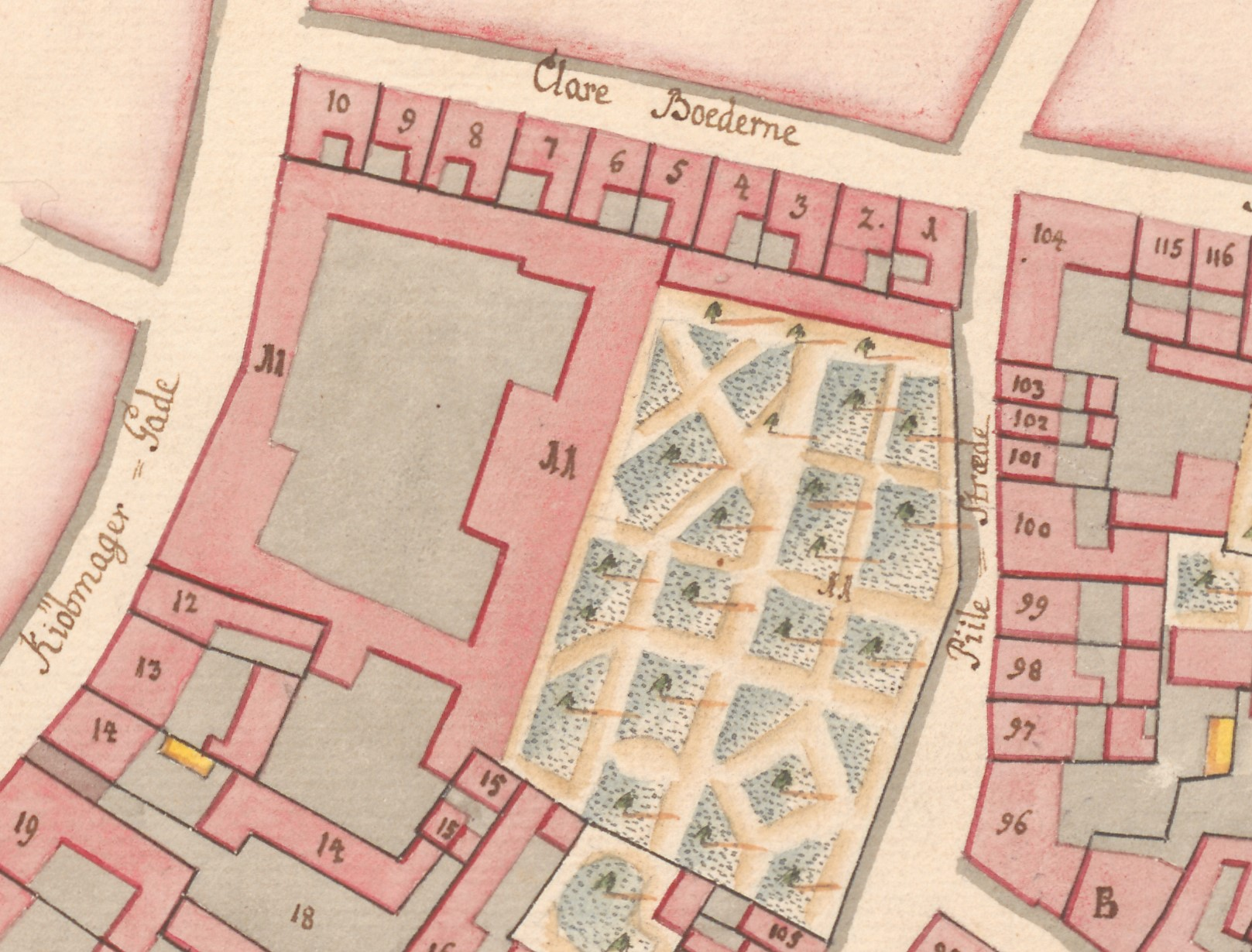
No. 11 seen on a detail from Christian Gedde's map of Købmager Quarter, 1757.

On Christian Ditlev Reventlow's death, the property passed to his son Christian Ditlev Reventlow. The property was listed in the new cadastre of 1756 as No. 11 in Købmager Quarter. It was referred to as Reventlow's Hotel at that time. A large four-winged building complex surrounding a central courtyard occupied the half of the property that faced the more prominent street Købmagergade. The half of the property that faced the quieter street Pilestræde was the site of a large garden complex. A row of small properties separated the property from Klareboderne in the northwest.

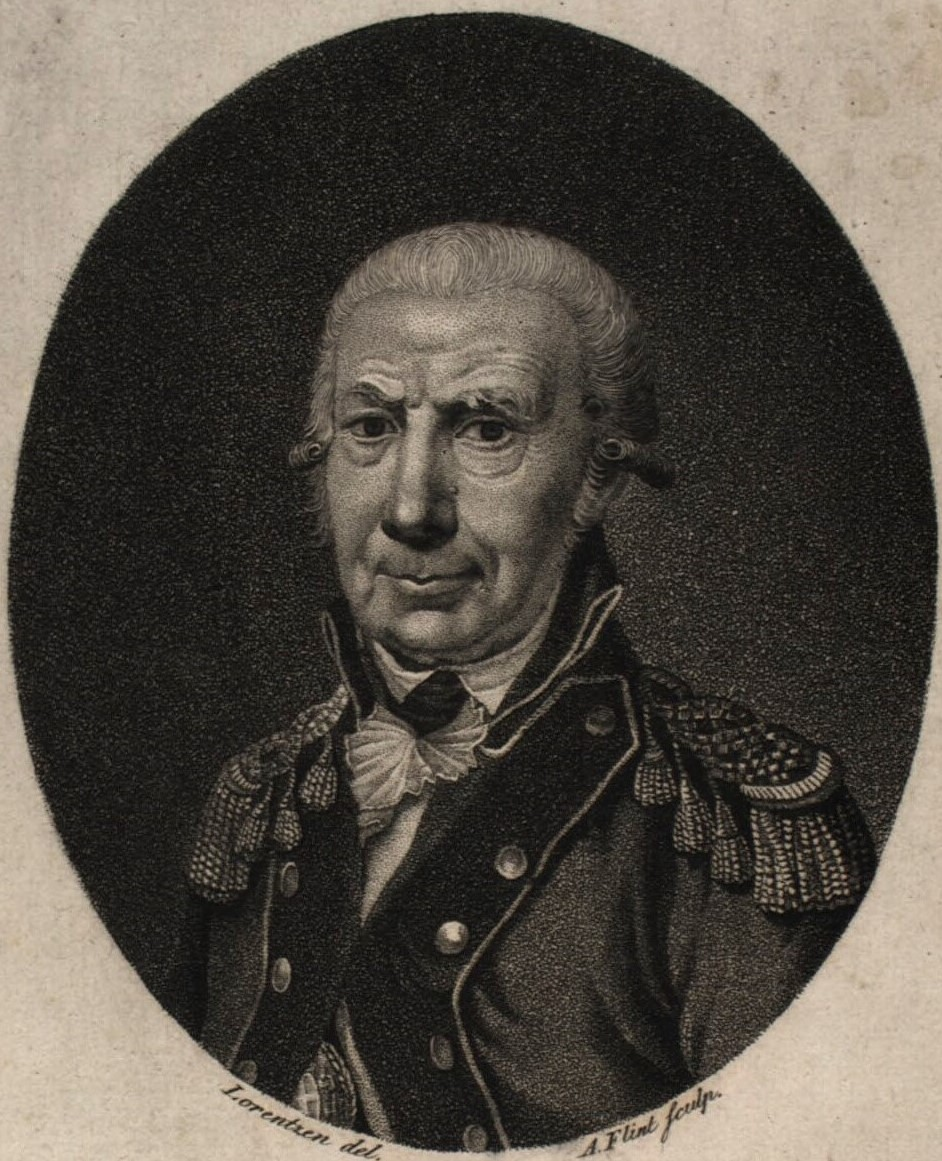
Johan Peter Boye Junge

In 1783 the property was acquired by the master builder Johan Peter Boye Junge (1735–1807), who was shortly thereafter granted royal permission to establish the new street Kronprinsensgade on the land. Boye Junge was one of the largest private employers in Copenhagen of his time.

The building at the southern corner of Købmagergade and Kronprinsessegade (now Købmagergade 34/Kronprinsensgade 2) was constructed by Boye Junge in 1785. The adjacent buildings in Købmagergade (now Købmagergade 32) and Kronprinsensgade (now Kronprinsensgade 4–6) were also constructed by him. The buildings at the northern corner of Kronprinsessegade and Pilestræde (now Kronprinsensgade 13 and Kronprinsensgade 11 were also constructed by Boye Junge. Most of the other lots in the new street were sold off to others.

=== Frisch and the new building ===
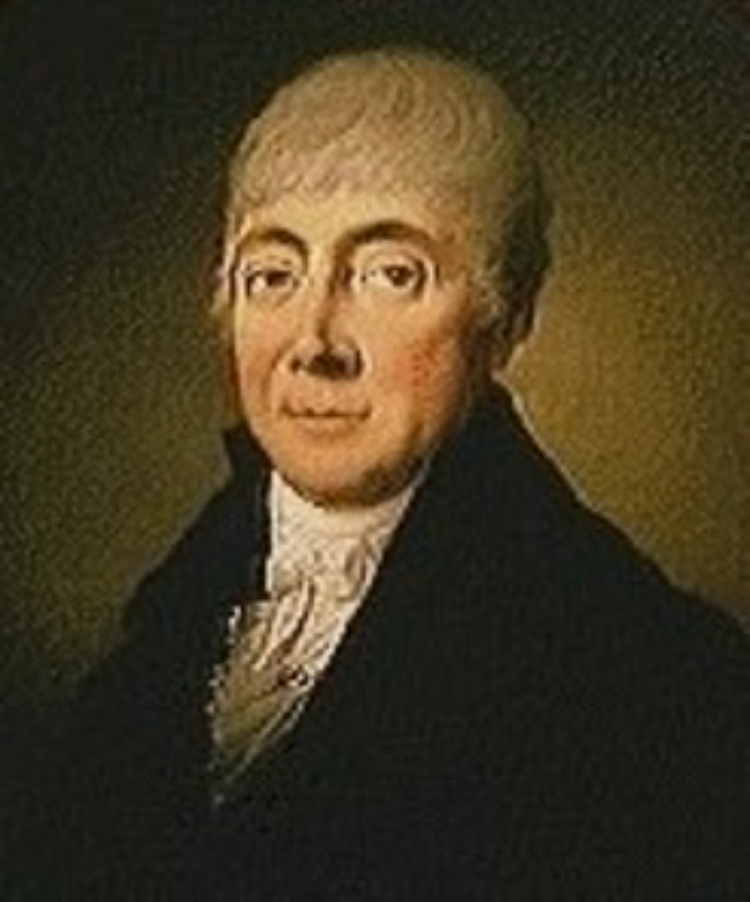
Marcus Hartvig Frisch.

The present building on the site was constructed in 1795 for Hartvig Marcus Frisch. The adjacent building at Kronprinsensgade 3, which was already completed in 1791, was also constructed for him. He also owned the country house Vodroffgård outside Copenhagen. The estate was both managed as a farm and the site of a water-powered factory. A few years later, Frisch, bought another property in an even more prominent location, on the square Nytorv, opposite Copenhagen's new city hall. He subsequently charged Nicolai Abildgaard with the design of what would later become known as the Frisch House after him.

=== Margrethe Rosted, 1799–1824 ===
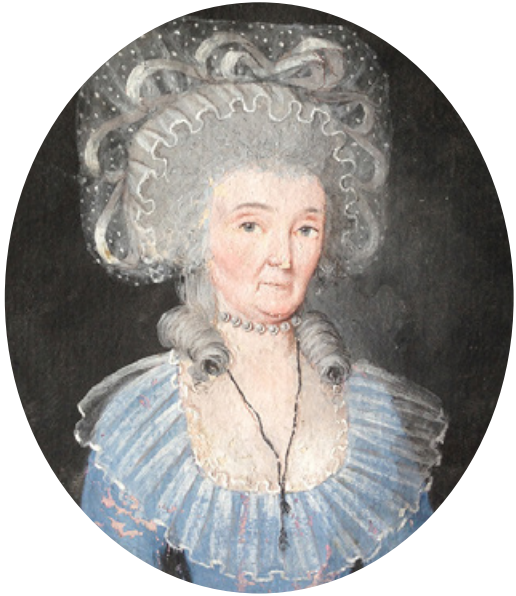
Cecilie Margrethe Rosted (née Rohde).

In 1799, Frisch sold the building at the corner of Købmagergade and Kronprinsensgade to the widow Cecilie Margrethe Rosted (née Rohde; 1743–1824). Cecilie Margrethe Rosted was the widow of county manager (amtsforvalter) in Roskilde Berthel Michael Rosted (1729-1785). She was the daughter of wine merchant Rasmus Rohde and his wife Giertrud Lentz. Her sister Mathilde Catharina Rohde (1838-1790) had married to the wealthy merchant and ship-owner Andreas Bodenhoff. On 6 January 1685, Cecilie Rosted's daughter Giertrud Birgitte Rosted (1776-1798) was married to their son, Andreas Bodenhoff Jr. (1763-1796). His death less than half a year later, on 5 June, left the daughter as one of the wealthiest women in the country. When the daughter also died, just two years later, on 18 July 1798, Cecilie Rosted inherited half of the estate. It was this newly acquired wealth that had enabled her to buy the house.

Cecilie Rosted was joined by Owan Ludvig Bodenhoff (1791-1871, a son of her son-in-laws' brother and sister-in-law, Lars Bodenhoff (1749-1804) and Dorothea Kirstine Reinhardt (1858-1804). At the time of the 1801 census, Cecilie Rosted and Owan Bodenhoff resided in the building with the lodger Iver Admidsbøll, Owan's tutor Johan Christ. Meldal (theology student), three maids (two listed as husjomfru and one as tjenestepige), one male servant, a coachman and a caretaker.

In the new cadastre of 1806, Margrethe Rosted's property was listed as No. 28 in Købmager Quarter. Margrethe Rosted owned the building until her death.

=== Royal Danish and Vajsenhus Pharmacy ===
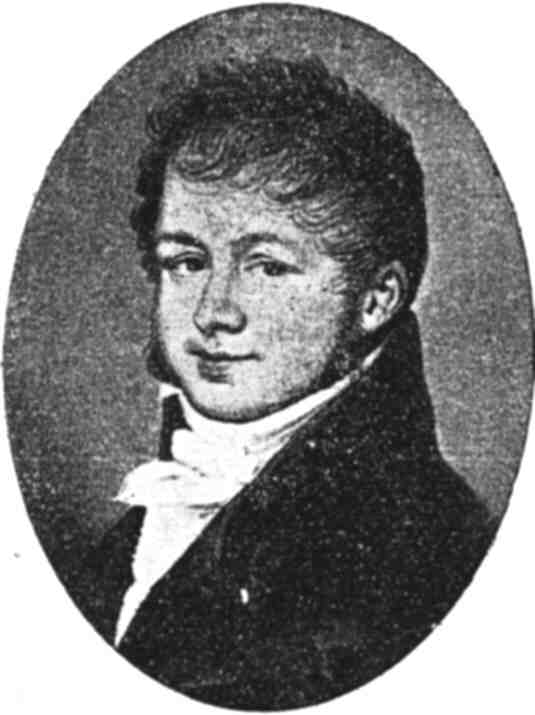
Jens Peter Groth.

On 31 May 1824, Jens Peter Groth (1787-1832) bought the building. On 30 November 1811, Groth had succeeded Johan Gotlieb Blau as the proprietor of Vajsenhus Pharmacy. The Copenhagen Fire of 1795 had left the pharmacy homeless. As of 1 June 1812, when Groth was awarded a monopoly on the supply of pharmaceutical products to the army and navy, the official name of his pharmacy was changed to the Royal Military and Vajsenhus Pharmacy (Det Kongelige Militære og Vajsenhus Apotek). On 25 May 1813, the pharmacy reopened in the new Vajsenhus Building on Købmagergade (now Købmagergade 44, but Groth had from the beginning found the new premises, in a side wing, away from the street, highly unsatisfactory. In 1826, after a comprehensive renovation, he was able to move his pharmacy to his new building.

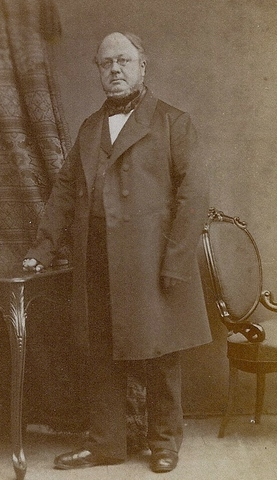
Johan Daniel Herholt Groth,

Groth was the son of Simon Peter Jensen Groth, a customs inspector, first in Copenhagen and then in Køge, and his wife Dorothea Magdalene Müller. He was married to Kathrine Marie Magdalene Ahrens, daughter of bookkeeper in the Danish West India Company Johann Leonhardt Arends and Karen Sophie Ahrens. He and his wife had four daughters and three sons. The second-eldest son, Johan Daniel Herholt Groth (1815–1881), who was named after the physician Johan Daniel Herholdt, his godfather, followed in his father's footsteps. However, as he was only 16 years old when his father died in 1832, the pharmacy was initially run by two trustees, Gjørling and Lund until he was old enough to take over the business, which happened in 1840. From 1832 to 1834, Albert Heinrich Riise, who would later become a pharmacist and merchant on Saint Thomas in the Danish West Indies, worked at the pharmacy.

Groth's property was home to 25 residents at the 1840 census. The other residents were his wife h Cathrine Louise Groth (née Ahlers, 1815–1897), their three-year-old daughter Cathrine Groth, his four sisters (aged 13 to 20), his uncle Carl Severin Groth (1792-1856, former captain). nine pharmacists (employees), three apprentices, three maids (two listed as husjomfru and one as stuepige), a female cook and a caretaker.

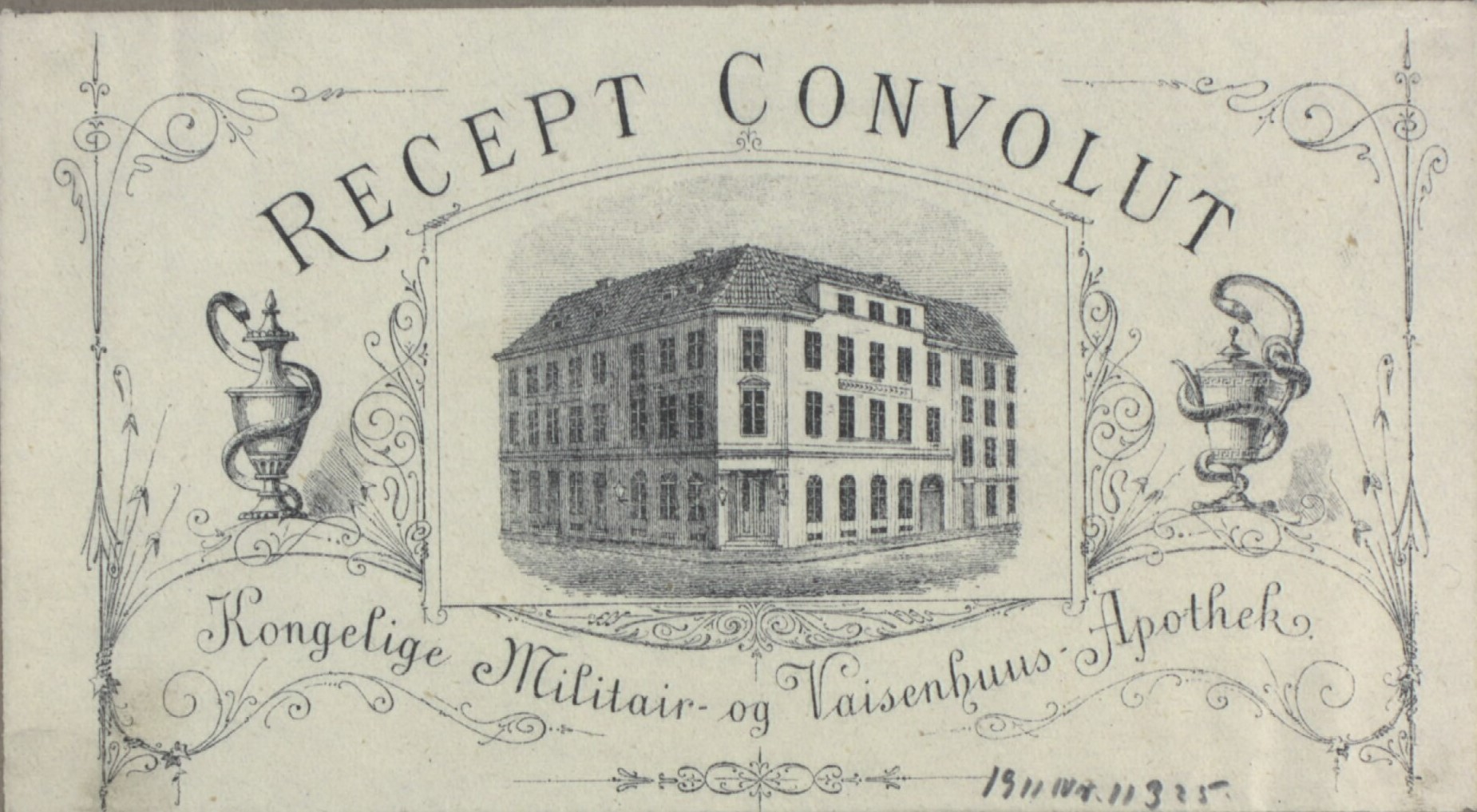
The building seen on an old perscription envoloppe.

At the 1850 census, Groth and his wife lived in the building with their now seven children, 12 employees, one male servant and four maids.

Groth and his wife would later have four more children. One of their 11 children was the painter Vilhelm Groth. The eldest daughter Cathrine Marie Magdalene Groth (1837- 1983). was married to the pharmacist Alfred Spreckelsen (1828-1901).

On 25 August 1866, Groth sold the pharmacy to the son-in-law and his partner Levin Levinsen Tvede (1834–1880). Johan Daniel Herholdt Groth moved to a villa at Bülowsvej 38 in Frederiksberg. Wilhelm Groth lived there with them until 1884.

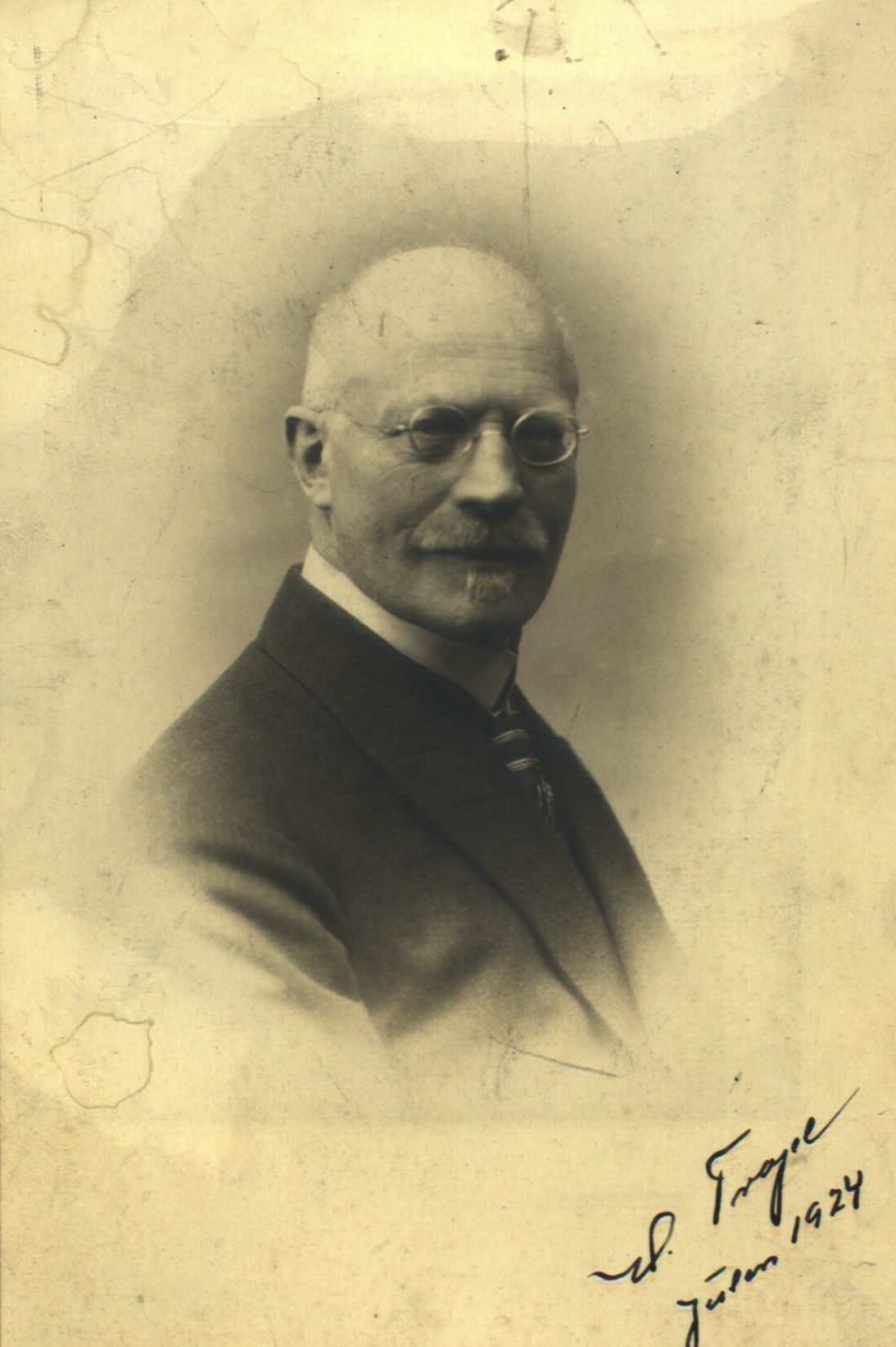
Hans Trojel.

From 1 January 1871, Spreckelsen was the sole owner of the pharmacy. On 17 August 1877, he bought the privilege from the Vajsenhus for DKK 125,000. In 1875–1880, Tvede was the proprietor of Løve Apotek in Frederikshavn.

In 1878, Spreckelsen sold the pharmacy for DKK 660,000 to Niels Peter Christian Lassen and Christian Julius Sophus Engberg.

On 25 February 1902, Vajsenhus Pharmacy was acquired for DKK 540,000 by Hans Jørgen Vilhelm Trojel (1862–1935). He operated it in partnership with Bictor Hans Meyer (1870–1942). From 1 April 1915, Vajsenhus Pharmacy lost its status as military pharmacy. Back in 1889, Trojel had taken over a materials-and dyes shop (material- og farvehandel) at the corner of Vestergrogade and Saxogade. It was subsequently operated under his own name until his death. In 1901, as Trojel & Meyer had also started an import of confectionary products. In 1918, Trojel & Meyer relocated to larger premises at Vesterbrogade 69—71. Hans Trojel was married to Nanna Trojel. The couple had five children. The family lived in an apartment above the shop on Vesterbrogade. Nanna Trojel established a social institution in Saxogade.

On 23 February 1918, Vajsenhus Pharmacy was taken over by Valdemar Dahlholm. On 4 January 1930, it was taken over by Kristian Rasmus Juul. On 9 March 1954, it was taken over byRlse Regeur. On 5 December 1986, it was taken over by Trine Juel Wibolt. In June 2003, she moved it to Landemærket. 3–5.

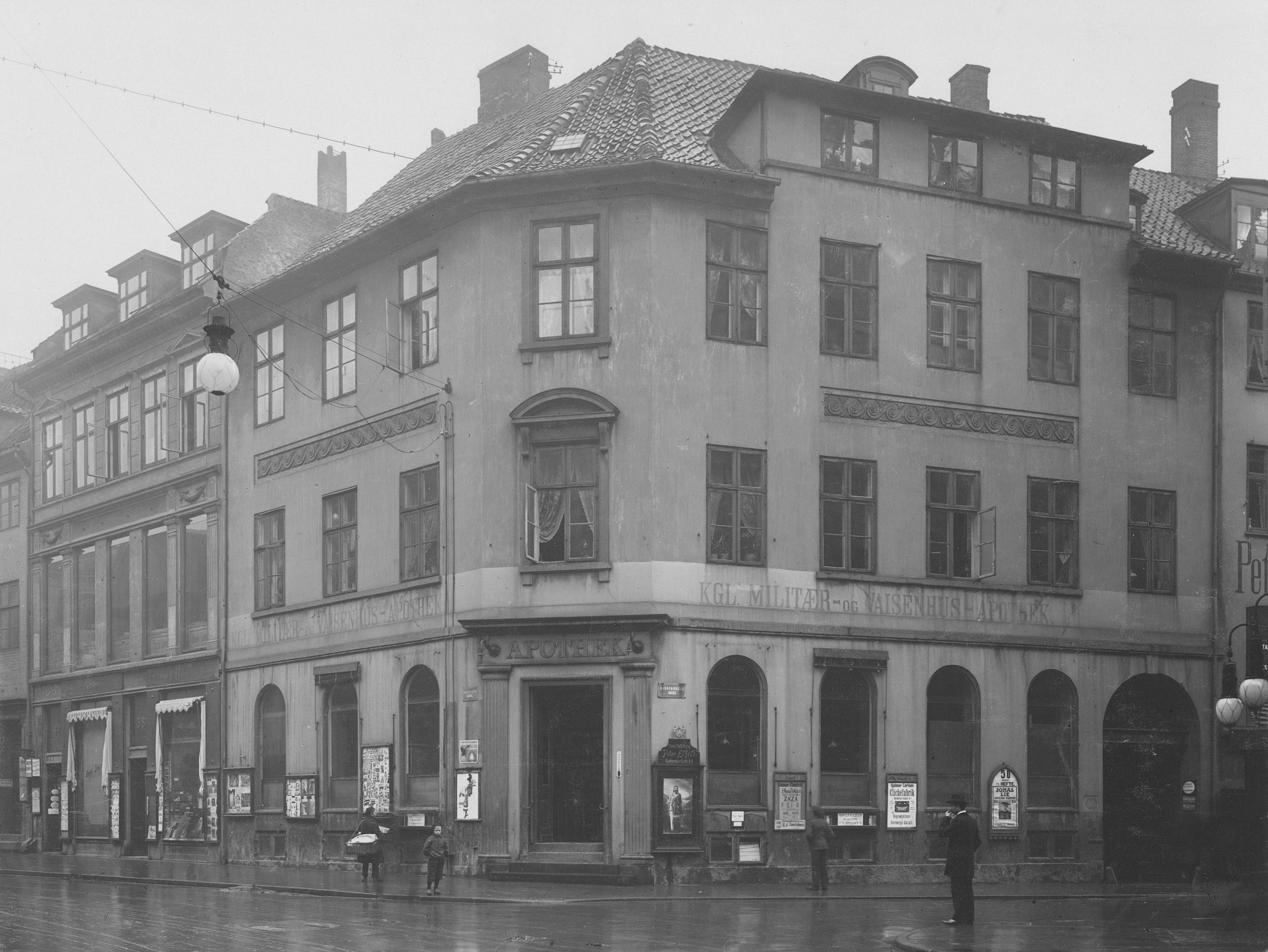
The building photographed in 1902m.

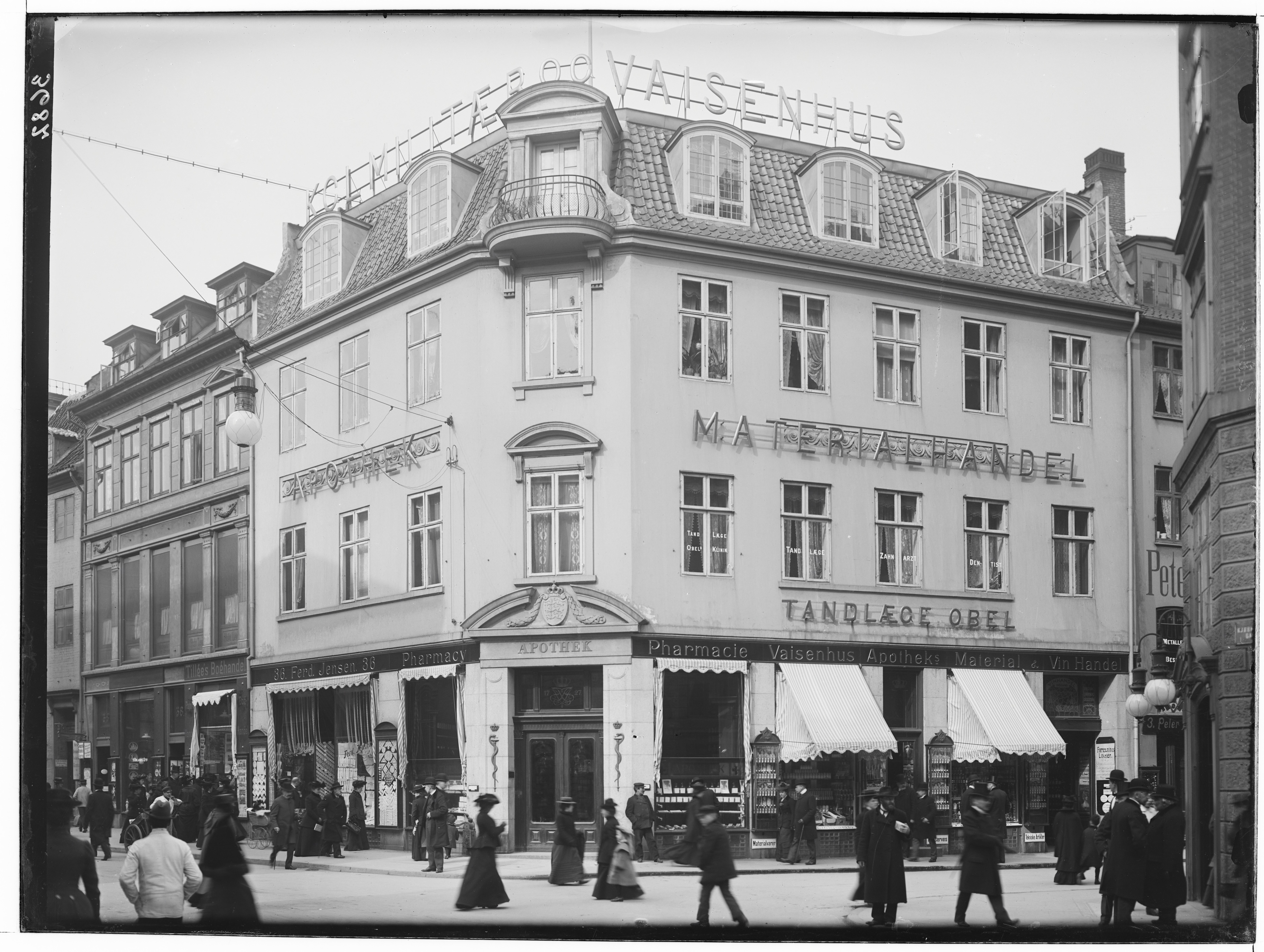
The building photographed by Peter Elfelt in 1903, now with a new roof.

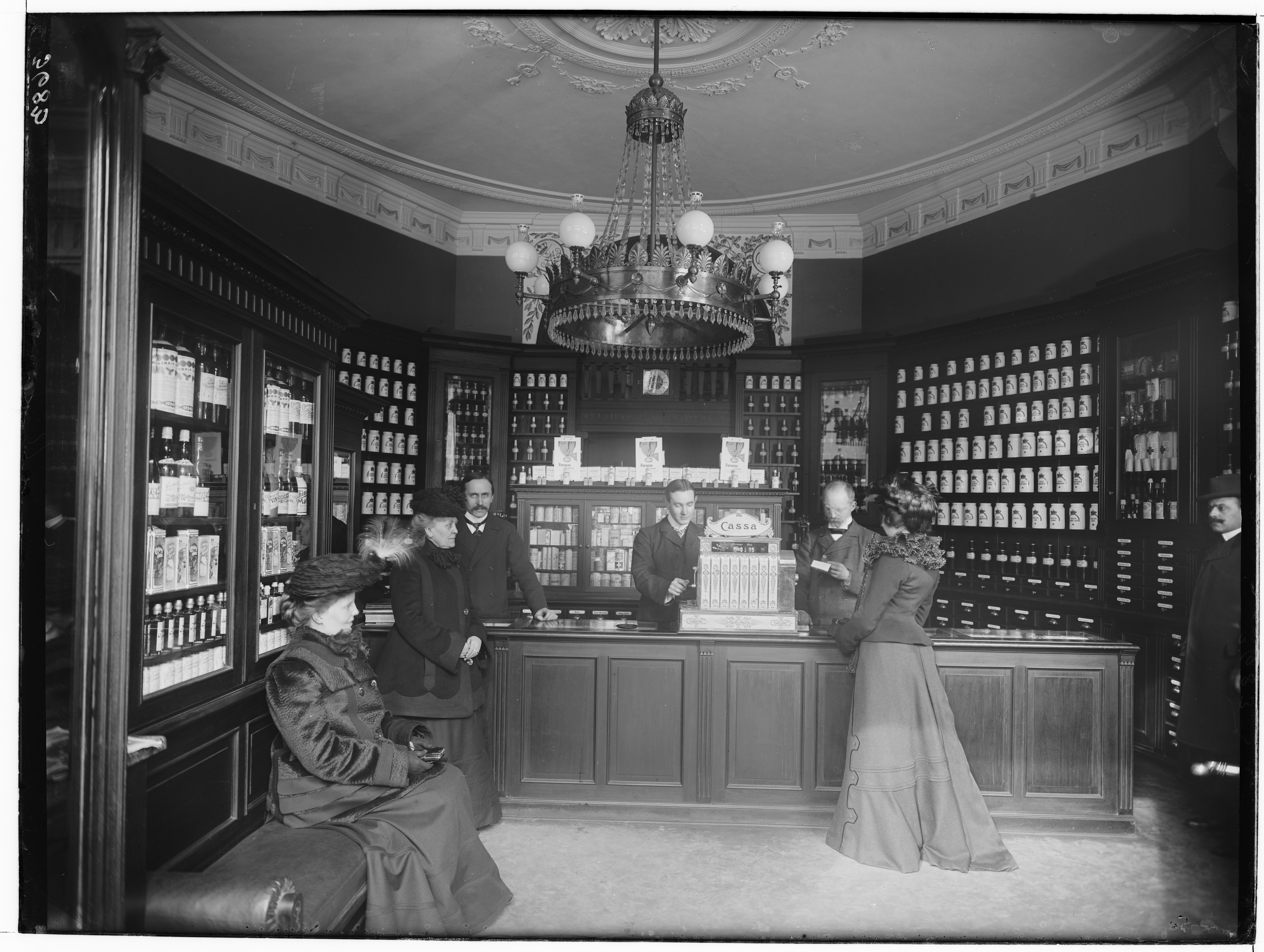
The interior of the pharmacy photographed by Peter Elfelt (1903)

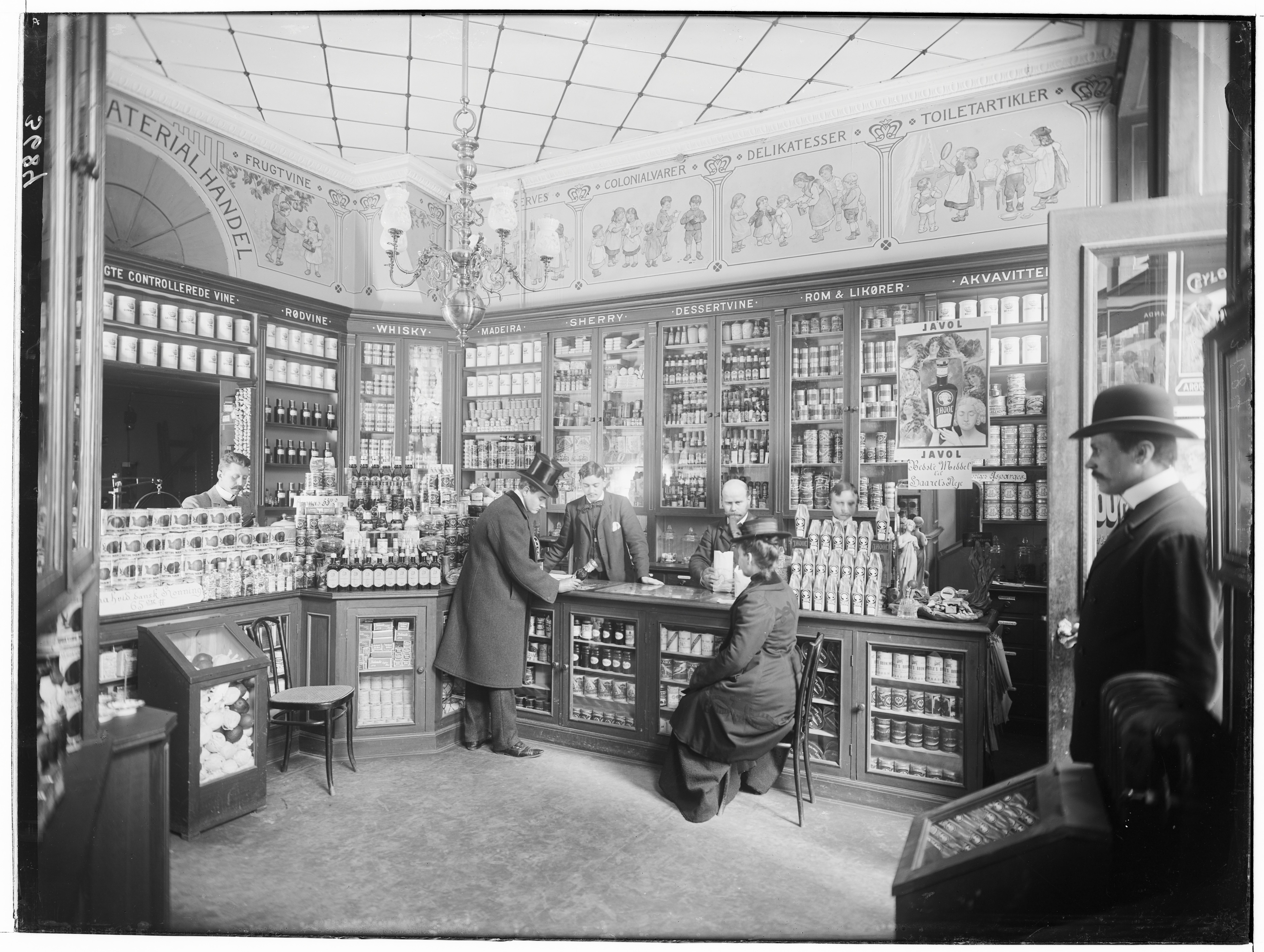
Interior: The materialhandel department.

=== Later history ===
As of 2008, Købmagergade 36/Kronprinsensgade 1 belonged to K/S Apotekergården.

== Architecture ==
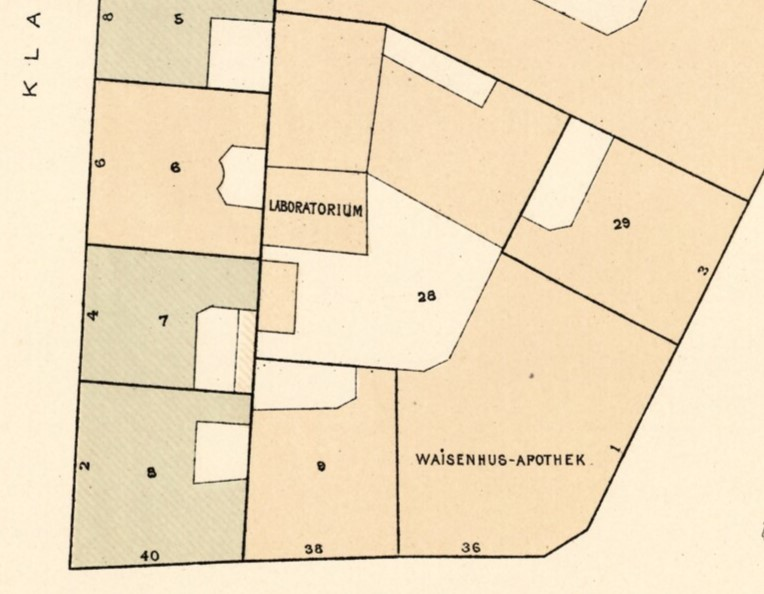
The building viewed on a detail from one of Berggreen's block plans of Købmager Quarter, 1886–88.

Købmagergade 36/Kronprinsensgade 1 is a three-storey obtuse-angled corner building with a five-bay-long facade towards Kronprinsensgade, a three-bay-long facade towards Købmagergade and a chamfered corner bay. The black Mansard roof dates from a renovation in 1902–03. It features a small balcony at the corner. The first- and second-floor corner windows are accented with extra framing. The first-floor corner window is in addition to this topped by a segmental pediment.

== Today ==
In 2018, H&M opened an H&M concept store in the building.
