= Hartvig Marcus Frisch =

Danish businessman (1754–1816)

Michael Fabritius
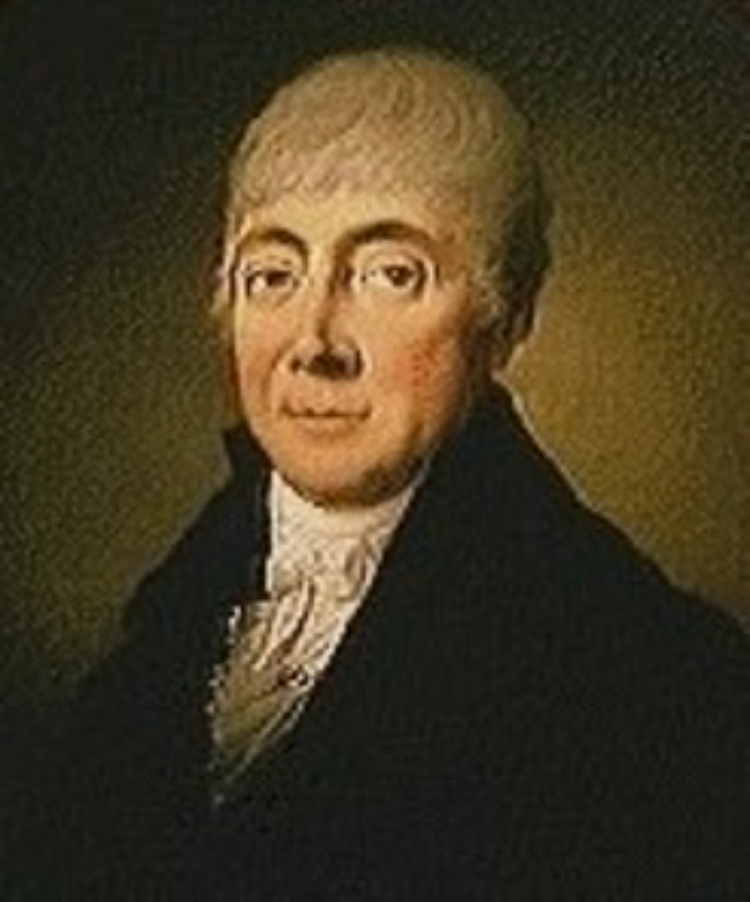
- H. M. Frisch painted by Christian August Lorentzen in c. 1811
- Born: 7 September 1754; Helsingør, Denmark
- Died: 22 August 1816 (aged 61)
- Occupation: Civil servant
- Known for: Frisch House

Hartvig Marcus Frisch (7 September 1754 – 22 August 1816) was a Danish businessman who served as director of the Royal Greenland Trading Department from 1781 to 1816. The Frisch House, his former home in Copenhagen, located at Nytorv 5, was designed by Nicolai Abildgaard. It is listed on the Danish registry of protected buildings and places.

== Early life and family ==
Frisch was born in Helsingør in 1754. His father, who was also called Hartvig Marcus Frisch (1709–1781), was inspector at Øresind Custom House. His mother was Jacobine Henriette Henrici, 1725–1769).

== Career ==
Frisch was in 1771 employed by Det Altonaiske Bankkontor. In 1774, he assumed a position as secretary for at Øresund Custom House. He assisted his father who, as a German-speaking Holsteiner, was challenged by the increasing use of Danish under Ove Høegh-Guldberg's years in office. In 1776, the same year that his father was granted pension, Frisch was promoted to protocollist. In 1781, after his father's death, he was initially appointed to senior supervisor (overtilsynsførende) of the Iceland-Finmark Trading Company but and later that same year to director of the Danish Royal Greenland Company with the title of justitsråd. Heinrich Schimmelmann recommended him for the positions. In 1782, Friederich Martini (1739–1821) was appointed as co-director.

In 1788, Frisch became a member of the Royal Greenland Trade Commission. In 1792, he also acted as director of Realisationskommissionen for det danske, norske, slesvigske og holstenske forenede handels- og kanalkompagni as well as a member of various commissions related to North Atlantic trade. In 1813, he was appointed to etatsråd.

== Property ==
The buildings at Kronprinsensgade 3 (c. 1791) and Købmagergade 36 (1795) were both constructed for Frisch. A few years later, he bought a property on Nytorv and charged civolai Abildgaard with the design of the building now known as the Frisch House after him. The building was listed in the Danish registry of protected buildings and places in 1918.

From 1794 to 1803, he also owned the estate Vodroffgård outside Copenhagen. The estate was both managed as a farm and the site of a water-powered factory. In 1810, Frisch purchased the estate Charlottendal at Slagelse.

== Personal life ==
On 10 January 1783, in Frederick's German Church, Frisch married to Dorothea (Dorthe) Tutein (1764–1814), a daughter of merchant and textile manufacturer Peter Tutein and Pauline Maria Tutein. They had the children Theodor Frisch (born 1787), Emil Frisch (born 1790), Henriette Pauline Frisch (born c. 1787), Sophie Frederikke Frisch (born 1796) and Constantin Frisch (born 1793).

Frisch belonged to the German congregations in Copenhagen and Helsingør. He died in Ems on 22 August 1816. The ship that transported his coffin home wrecked.
