= The Wounded Philoctetes =

1775 painting by Nicolai Abildgaard

- Den sårede Filoktet (Danish)
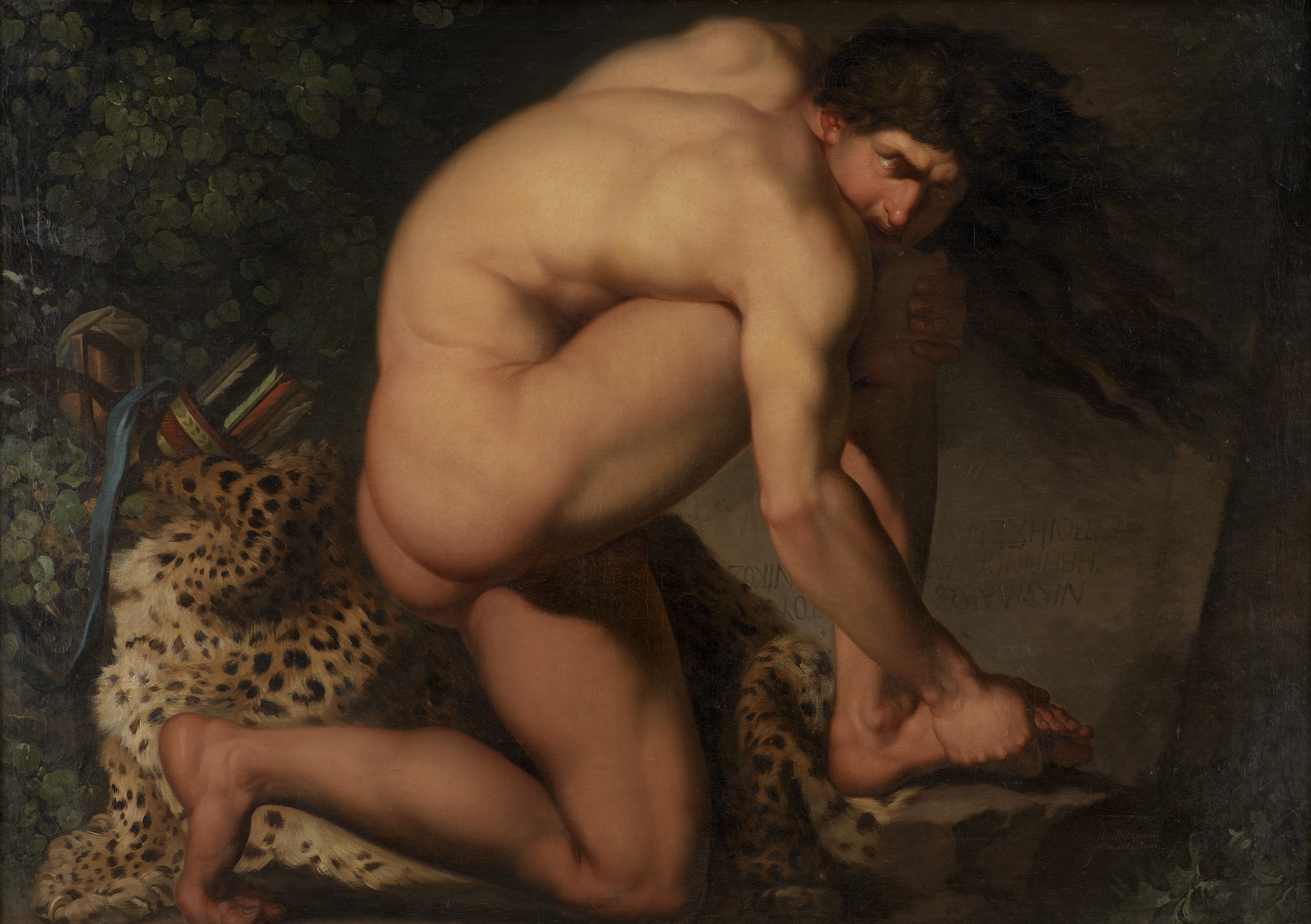
- Artist: N. A. Abildgaard
- Year: 1775
- Medium: Oil on canvas
- Dimensions: 123 cm × 175.5 cm (48 in × 69.1 in)
- Location: National Gallery of Denmark, Copenhagen

The Wounded Philoctetes is a painting by the Danish painter, N. A. Abildgaard. It was painted in 1775.

Having received a five-year scholarship from the Royal Danish Academy of Fine Arts, Abildgaard stayed in Rome where he painted his interpretation of the hero Philoctetes who was wounded by a snake and left behind on a Greek island by his brothers-in-arms during the Trojan War.
