= Le Triumvirat =

Tragedy in five acts by Voltaire

- Original title: Octavian et le jeune Pompée ou le Triumvirat
- Original language: French
- Written by: Voltaire
- Subject: Second Triumvirate, Sextus Pompey
- Genre: Tragedy
- Setting: Roman Republic

Premiere
- Date: 5 July 1764
- Original run: 1764-1764

Octavian et le jeune Pompée ou le Triumvirat (better known simply as Le Triumvirat) is a tragedy in five acts written by Voltaire in 1763. The play was premiered on 5 July 1764 and the script was published in 1766. Its plot centers around the Second Triumvirate's conflict with Sextus Pompey and mainly focuses on the ill that happens to the women in the lives of the men involved in the conflict.

Voltaire wrote an essay named "Des conspirations contre les peuples, ou des proscriptions" (Concerning conspiracies against peoples, or proscriptions) as an editorial supplement to the play.

== Characters ==
- Octave, a triumvir
- Marc-Antoine, a triumvir
- Pompée, enemy of the Triumvirate
- Julie, daughter of Lucius César and lover of Pompée
- Fulvie, wife of Marc-Antoine
- Albine, confidante of Fulvie
- Aufide, a military tribune

== Premiere and reception ==
The play premiered on July 5 1764 at the Comédie-Française and was met with a negative reception. The play flopping had been feared in advance by several parties, including Voltaire and the theater company, Comédie-Française had been reluctant to produce the play. It closed after four performances. The play is considered to be Voltaire's only "complete failure" at the French stage.

== Art ==
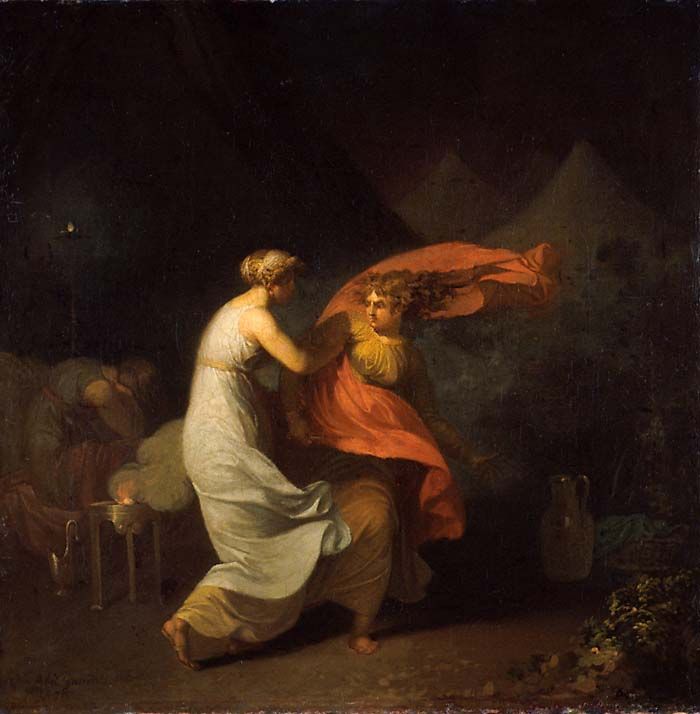
Julia og Fulvia by Nicolai Abildgaard, held in the National Museum of Norway.

Danish painter Nicolai Abildgaard painted several scenes from the play. Four of these paintings are held in a room at the Frisch House in Copenhagen. These paintings were regarded as quite politically charged.
