= Frisch House =

- Frischs Gård
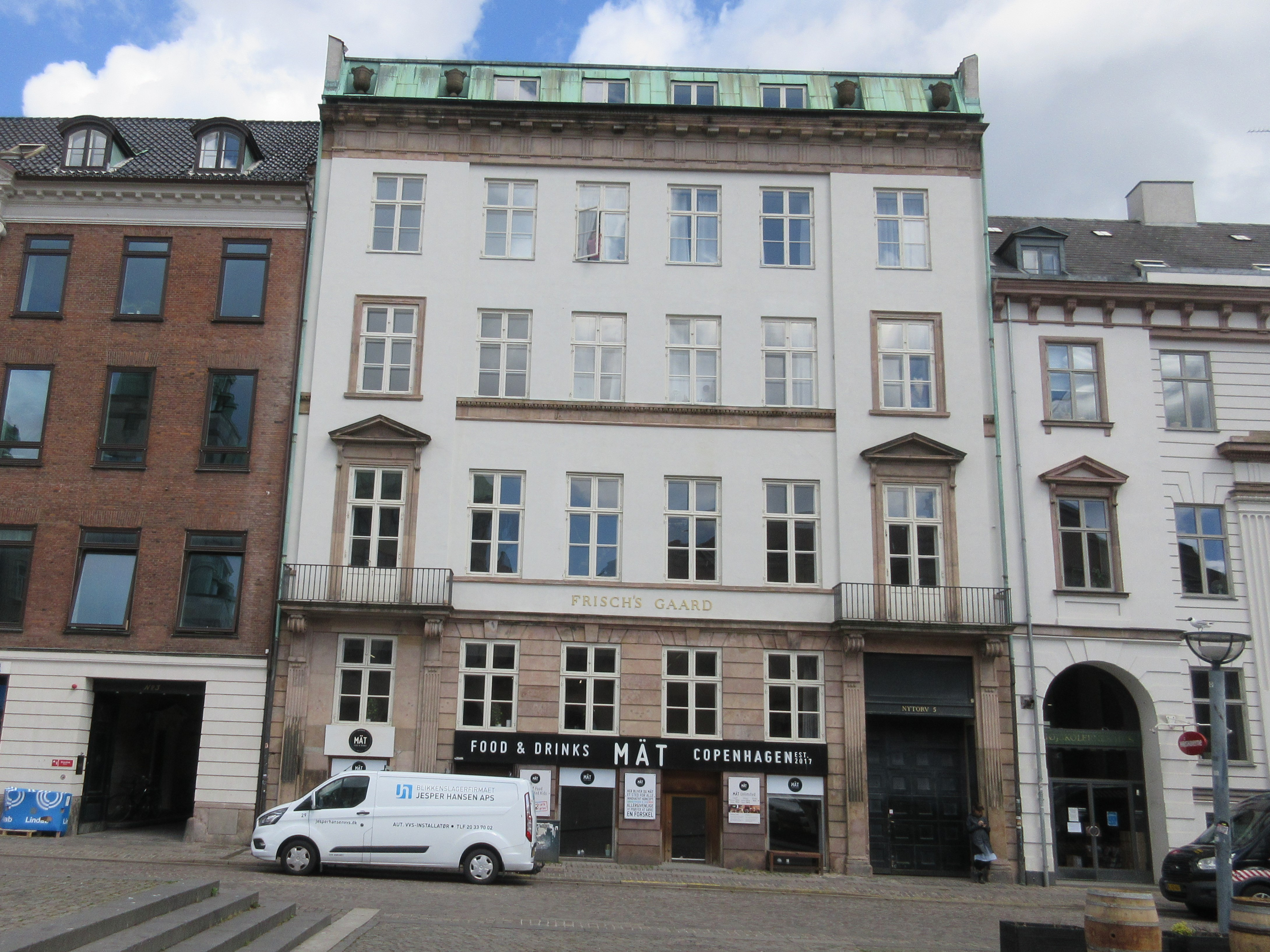
- Interactive map of the Frisch House area

General information
- Architectural style: Neoclassical
- Location: Copenhagen, Denmark
- Coordinates: 55°40′39.91″N 12°34′24.1″E
- Completed: 1803
- Client: Hartvig Marcus Frisch
- Owner: Nordea

Design and construction
- Architect: Nicolai Abildgaard

The Frisch House (Danish: Frischs Hus) is a Neoclassical property overlooking the square Nytorv (No. 5) in the Old Town of Copenhagen, Denmark. The building was designed by the artist Nicolai Abildgaard although it has later been expanded with an extra floor. A room on the first floor features four Abildgaard paintings with scenes from Voltaire's Le Triumvirat.

== History ==
=== 18th century ===
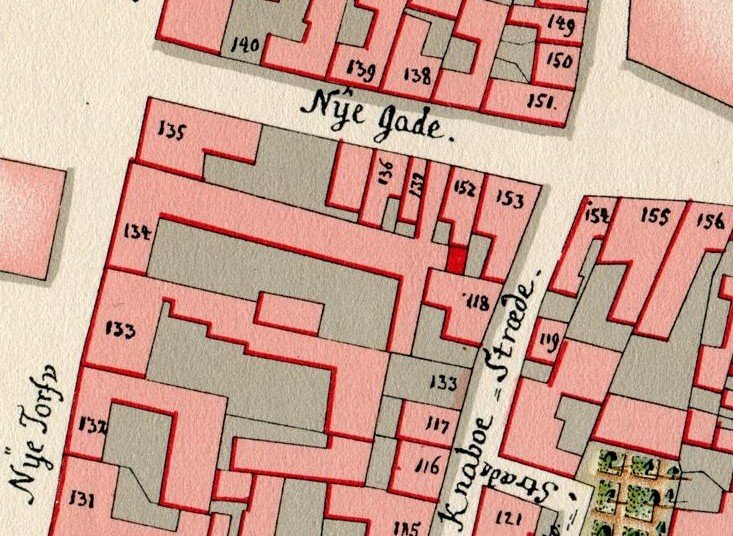
No. 133 seen on a detail from Christian Gedde's map of Snaren's Quarter, 1757.

The property was listed in Copenhagen's first cadastre of 1689 as No. 151 in Snaren's Quarter, owned by Hans Levesen. It was later owned by the physician Hieronimus Laub (1689–1753) until his death. His former property was listed in the new cadastre of 1756 as No. 133 in Snaren's Quarter.

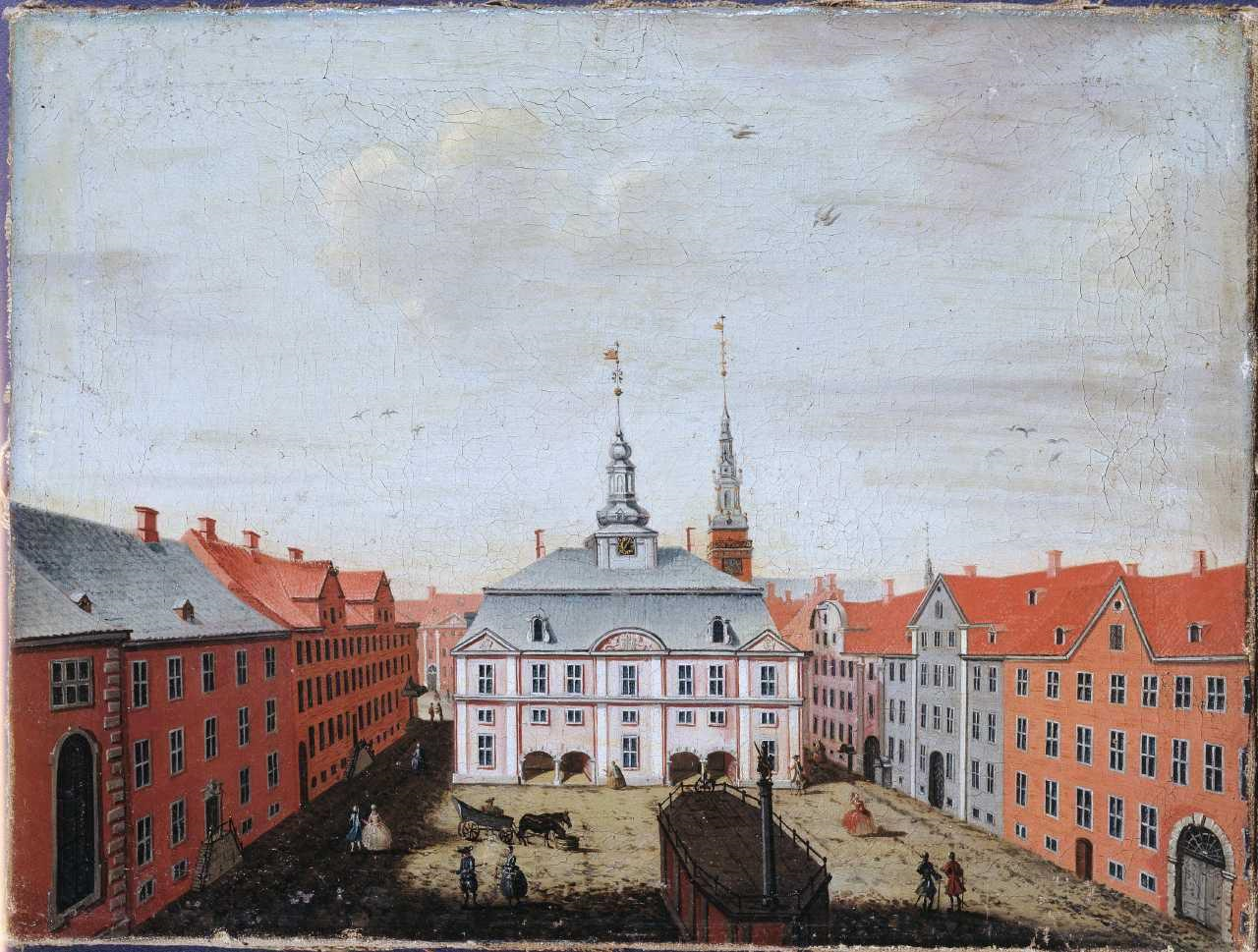
Laub's building seen just right of the former City Hall, 1848.

The property was home to three households at the 1787 census. Wielhelm August Hansen (1743–1685), a high-ranking civil servant in Rentekammeret, resided in the building with his wife Inger Charlotte Graah, a servant, a coachman, a caretaker, a female cook and a maid. Morten Munck (1730–1796), a councilman and director, resided in the building with three sons, three daughters, a servant, a housekeeper, a female cook and a maid. Munck's wife Karen Barfred had died in 1781. The eldest of the three sons was naval officer Hans Munck (1877–1822). Martha Catharine Block, the proprietor of a tavern in the basement, resided in the associated dwelling with her four children (aged three to 12) and one maid. Munck's wife Karen Barfred had died in 1781. The eldest of the three sons was naval officer Hans Munck (1877–1822).

=== Frisch and the new building ===
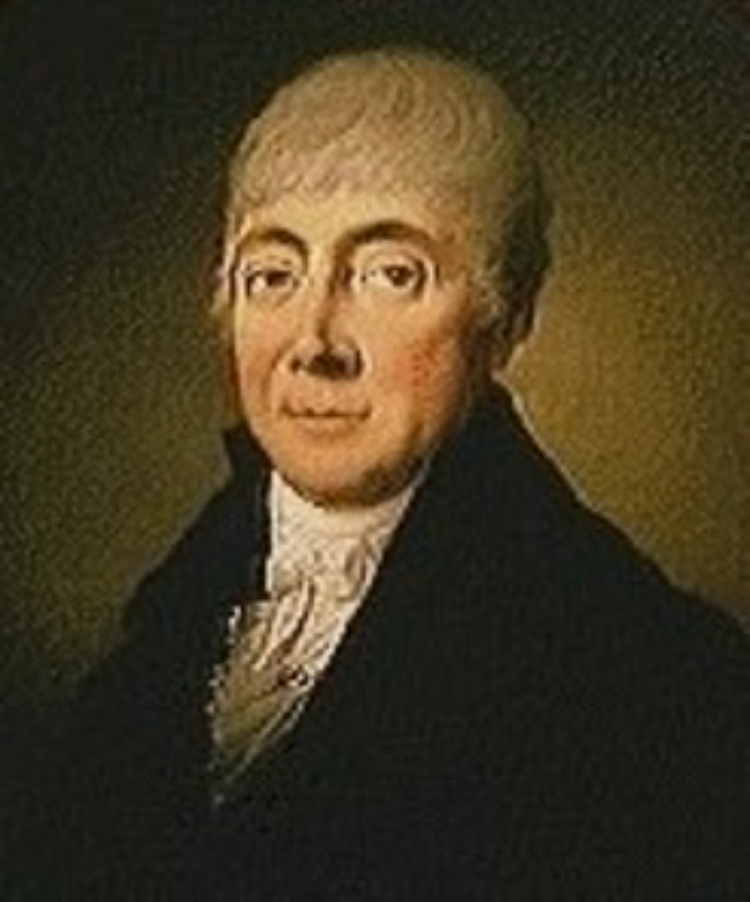
Hartvig Marcus Frisch painted in c. 1800 by C. A. Lorentzen

The property was destroyed in the Copenhagen Fire of 1795, together with the Copenhagen City Hall and most of the other buildings in the area. The present building was built in 1799–1803 for justitsråd Hartvig Marcus Frisch, who was director of the Royal Greenland Trade Department. The building was designed by Nicolai Abildgaard.

At the time of the 1801 census, the property was home to a total of 18 people. Peder Kiær, a 27-year-old grocer (urtekræmmer), resided in the building with his wife Lovisa Augusta Bernsteen, an employee, an apprentice and a maid. Erlang Berg, a senior clerk (fuldmægtig), resided in the building with his wife and two maids. Frederik Schwarz, an actor, resided in the building with his wife Anna Sophia Mays, three of their children (aged 19 to 21), a ten-year-old granddaughter, his mother Lise Swartz, a female cook and a maid. The property was listed as No. 88 in the new cadastre of 1806. It was still owned by Frisch.

=== 1749–1900 ===
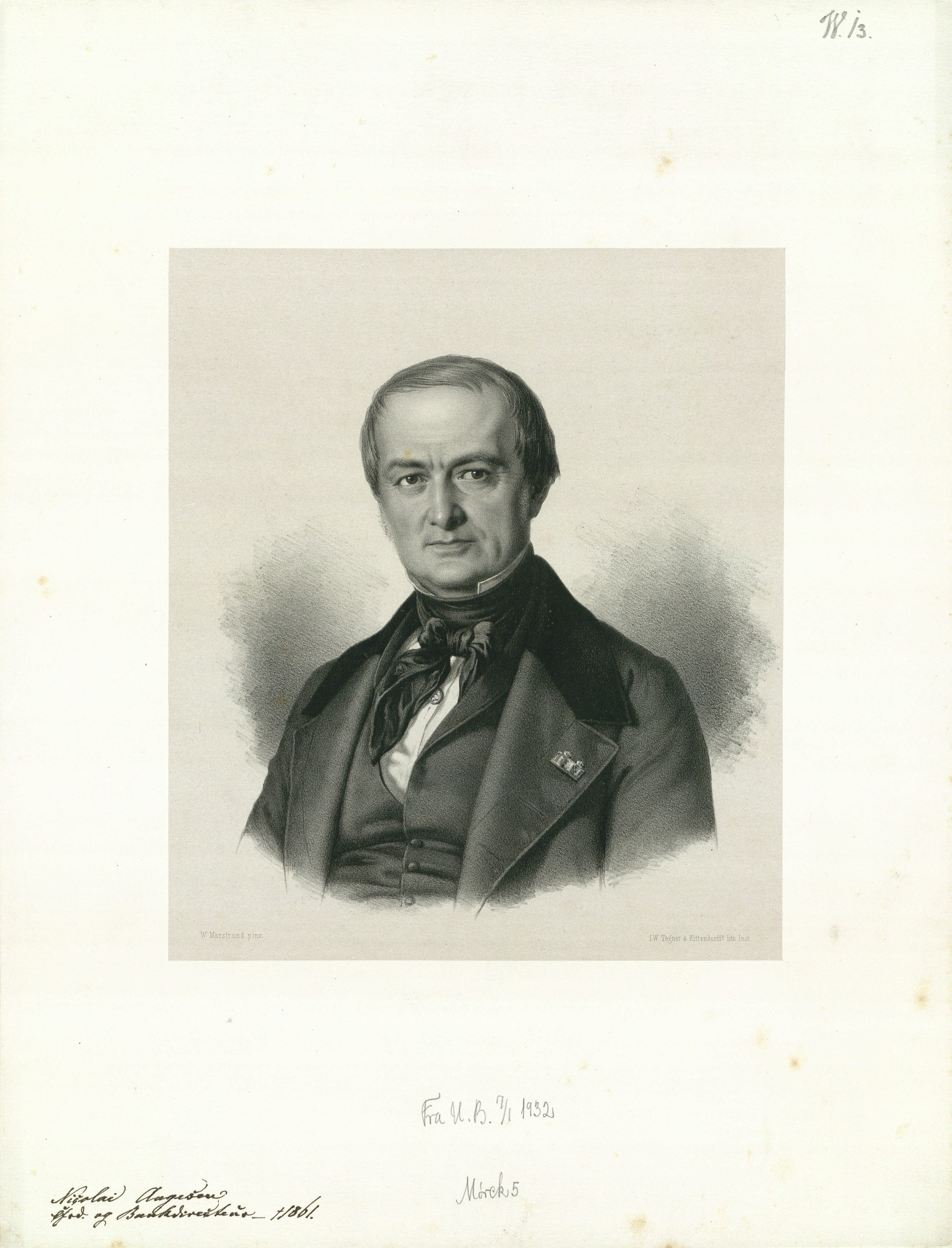
Nicolai Aagesen

The property was acquired by Nicolai Aagesen (1783–1861) in the 1830s. He served as governor of the Bank of Denmark. He was married to Julie Augusta Drewsen, daughter of the wealthy paper manufacturer Christian Drewsen from Strandmøllen. Their eldest daughter Hanne Nicolaisen Aagesen married on 17 February 1838 Just Mathias Thiele.

Aagesen's property was home to a total of 38 people at the time of the 1840 census. The owner resided on the second floor with his wife Julie, their two youngest children (aged 14 and 18), his mother-in-law Ane Christine Dorthea Drewsen (née Lassen) and four maids. Lars Jess Holm, a civil servant (deputeret) in the Danish Chancery and Aagesen's brother-in-law, resided on the first floor with his wife Gjertrud Cathrine Holm (née Aagesen), their three-year-old son, a servant and two maids. Henriette Jeremia Frederichsen (née Borch, 1792–1860), wife of Friderich Friderichsen (1798–1863), resided on the ground floor with her nieces Henriette Marie Borch (born 1824) and Alvilda Hansteen (1824–1908), one servant and two maids. Niels Jørgensen and Hans Andersen, two grocers (høker), resided in the basement with their respective families and a number of employees.

Julie Augusta Aagesen died in October 1847. Aagesen was still residing in the second floor apartment at the time of the 1850 census. He lived there with his son Andreas Aagesen, his mother-in-law Anna Christine Dorothea Drewsen (née Lassen), a housekeeper, one male servant and two maids. Samuel Jacob Ballin (1802-1866), a medical doctor, resided on the first floor with his wife Dorthea Ballin (née Trier), their two daughters (aged nine and 13) and two maids. Otte Didrich Lorentzen, a wine merchant, resided on the ground floor with his wife Karen Hansine Schou, their 16-year-old daughter, a housekeeper, two maids, a clerk, three wine merchant's apprentices and a workman.

The property was home to a total of 64 residents at the time of the 1860 census. Nicolai Aagesen was still living on the second floor. His son, Andreas Aagesen, a professor of law, was still living there with his father. Wine merchant Otto Diderich Lorentzen was still resided on the first floor with his wife and a number of employees. Wulff Philip Hyman (1794–1866)m a businessman, resided on the second floor with his family and employees. Julius Christian Jørgensen, a judge, resided on the third floor.

Andreas Aagesen kept the building after his father's death in 1861. On 26 October 1862, he married Thora Alvilde de Neergaard, daughter of the landowner Peter Johansen de Neergaard (1802–1872) and Betzy Isidore Østergaard. Their son and only child Nicolai Peter Aagesen was born in the building in 1870.

=== 1880 census ===
The property was home to 38 residents at the 1880 census. Karen Jensine Lorentzen, who continued the family's wine firm after her husband's death, resided on the first floor with her foster daughter Vilhelmine Louise Femja Krebs, a housekeeper (husjomfru), a maid and two coachmen. August Klein, an architect, resided on the second floor with his wife Pouline Clemmentine Klein, their four children (aged three to seven) and one maid.

The politician Herman Trier resided on the third floor from 1892 to 1900.

=== 20th century ===
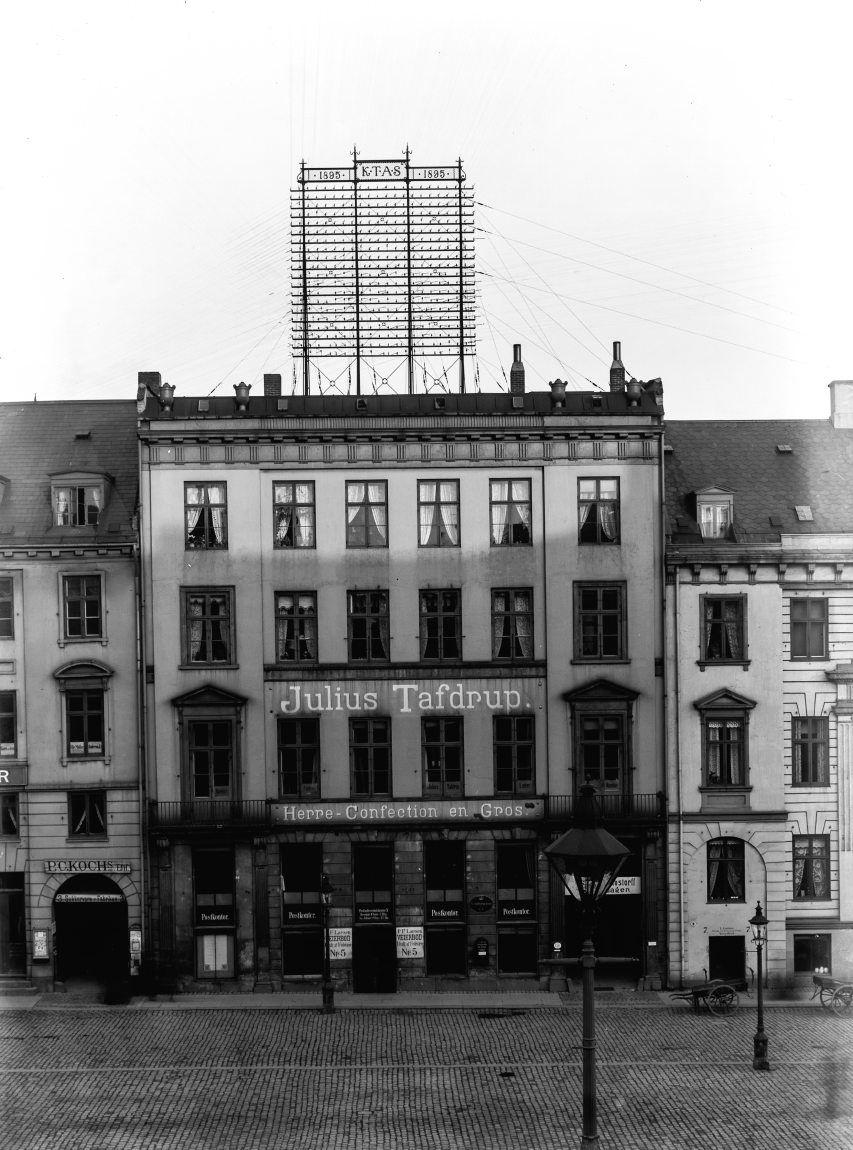
Nytorv 5 in December 1905 when it was owned by Julius Tafdrup

The clothing merchant Julius Tafdrup's wholesale business relocated to the building in 1898. Om 1898, He also operated a clothing store on the ground floor. The company moved to new premises at Studiestræde 57 in 1907 and in 1913 to the property at Vesterbrogade 9B.

The property was home to 11 residents at the 1906 census. Elgine Augusta Larsen, a concierge, resided on the ground floor. Frederik Vilhelm Ryder, a physician, resided on the second floor with his wife Johanne Margrethe Ruder, their 12-year-old daughter and two maids. Carl Albert Bruun, a retired retailer, resided on the third floor with two lodgers and one maid. One of the lodgers was the art student Viggo Christian Hansen. Laura Bruun, a 64-year-old unmarried woman, resided on the same floor.

The building complex was listed in 1918. Henry Timmol's Eftf, a clothing wholesale business founded in 1791, was based at Nytorv 5A in 1950.

Provinsbanken, Denmark's fifth largest bank at the time. purchased the building in 1988. It was subsequently restored. In 1990, Provinsbanken merged with Danske Bank and the property was later sold to Nordea. On 31 December 2014, Nordea sold Nytorv 5-5A together with neighbouring Nygade 1–3 and Knabrostræde 6–8 to Danica Pension for DKK 370 million.

== Architecture ==
The building is six bays wide. The facade of Abildgaard's original building was tipped by a triangular pediment and vases.

The most well-preserved interiors are located on the first floor. A restoration carried out in 1988 unveiled four paintings by Abildgaard that had been painted over with later decorations. They depict scenes from Voltaire's tragedy Le Triumvirat.

The building was expanded with an extra storey by the architect August Klein in 1889–1890. Jurist Andreas Aagesen lived in the building from 1852.

== Today ==
Restaurant & Café Nytorv occupies the ground floor. Other tenants include the law firm Christian Harlang.

== See also ==
- Listed buildings in Copenhagen Municipality
