= Culmin's Ghost Appears to his Mother =

1794 painting by Nicolai Abildgaard

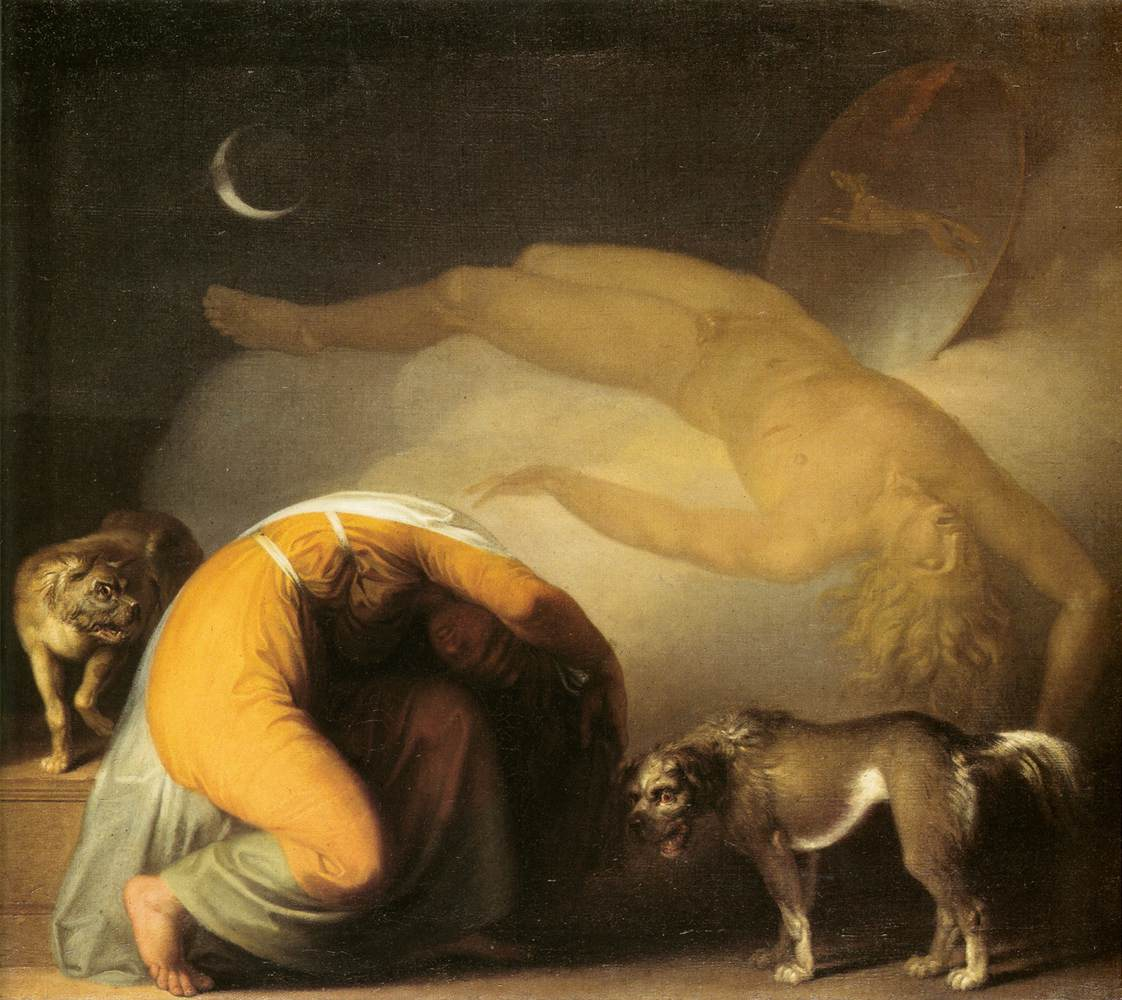
- Artist: Nicolai Abildgaard
- Year: 1794
- Medium: Oil on canvas
- Dimensions: 62 cm × 78 cm (24 in × 31 in)
- Location: Nationalmuseum; Stockholm

Culmin's Ghost Appears to his Mother is an oil on canvas painting of 1794 by the Danish neoclassical artist Nicolai Abildgaard. It depicts a scene from the Ossian poetry cycle.
