= Vilhelm Groth =

Danish landscape painter (1842–1899)

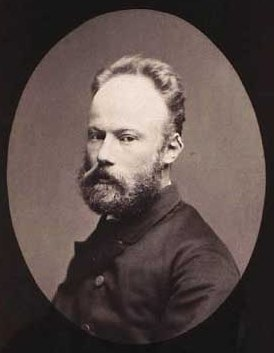
Vilhelm Groth (date unknown)

Georg Vilhelm Arnold Groth (9 March 1842, Copenhagen – 14 September 1899, Copenhagen) was a Danish landscape painter.

== Biography ==
His father was a pharmacist and his mother came from a family of merchants. After taking a diploma at the Det von Westenske Institut, a private gymnasium, he began his artistic instruction at the drawing school operated by Frederik Ferdinand Helsted.

In 1861, he took some classes at the Royal Danish Academy of Fine Arts, then attended the Modelskolen, but his studies were interrupted when he was conscripted to serve in the Second Schleswig War. He graduated from the academy in 1866 and held his first exhibition that same year. From 1872 to 1878, he made several study trips to Italy and France; notably a trip to Paris from 1875 to 1876.

Later in 1876, when the highly respected painter, Vilhelm Kyhn, rejected the desirability of seeking inspiration from the French, Groth strongly disagreed. He wrote Dansk Kunst i Forhold til Udlandets (1876), providing a new approach to historical awareness of past influences. Inspired by the work of Georg Brandes, he argued that every period imposes its own requirements and that Realism was the appropriate goal for contemporary Danish artists. This led him to associate with the "Bogstaveligheden" (roughly, the "Literalists") a group of radical intellectuals who between 1880 and 1882 met to discuss art and literature . Karl Gjellerup and Pietro Krohn were among its most notable members.

His best works are generally believed to be those he did along the shores of Lillebælt and Hellebæk. In 1874, his painting Hede med en Mose (Heath with a Bog) was acquired for the Royal Collection.

== Selected Paintings ==
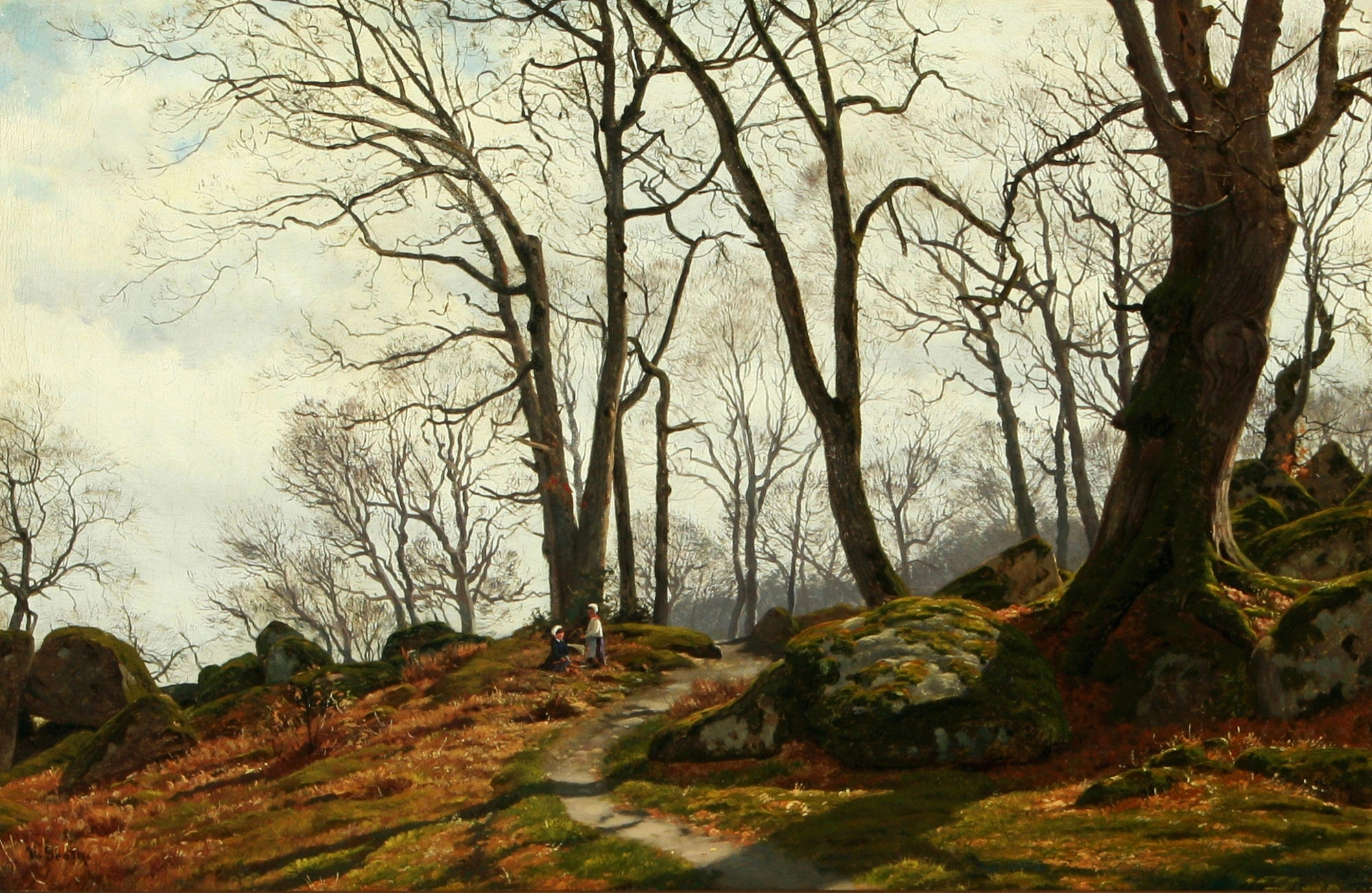
Two Young Girls in the Autumn Woods.

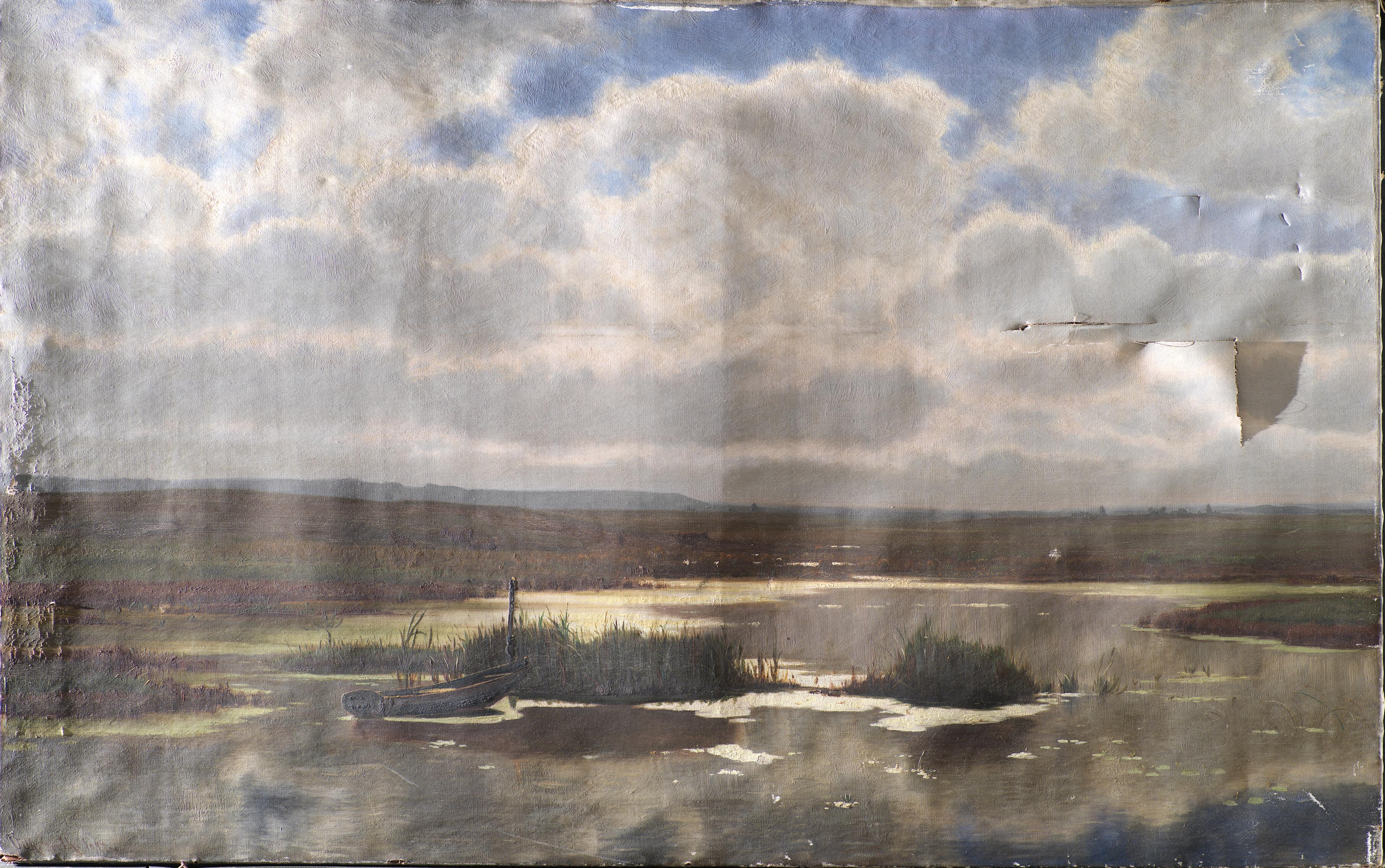
Heath with a Bog

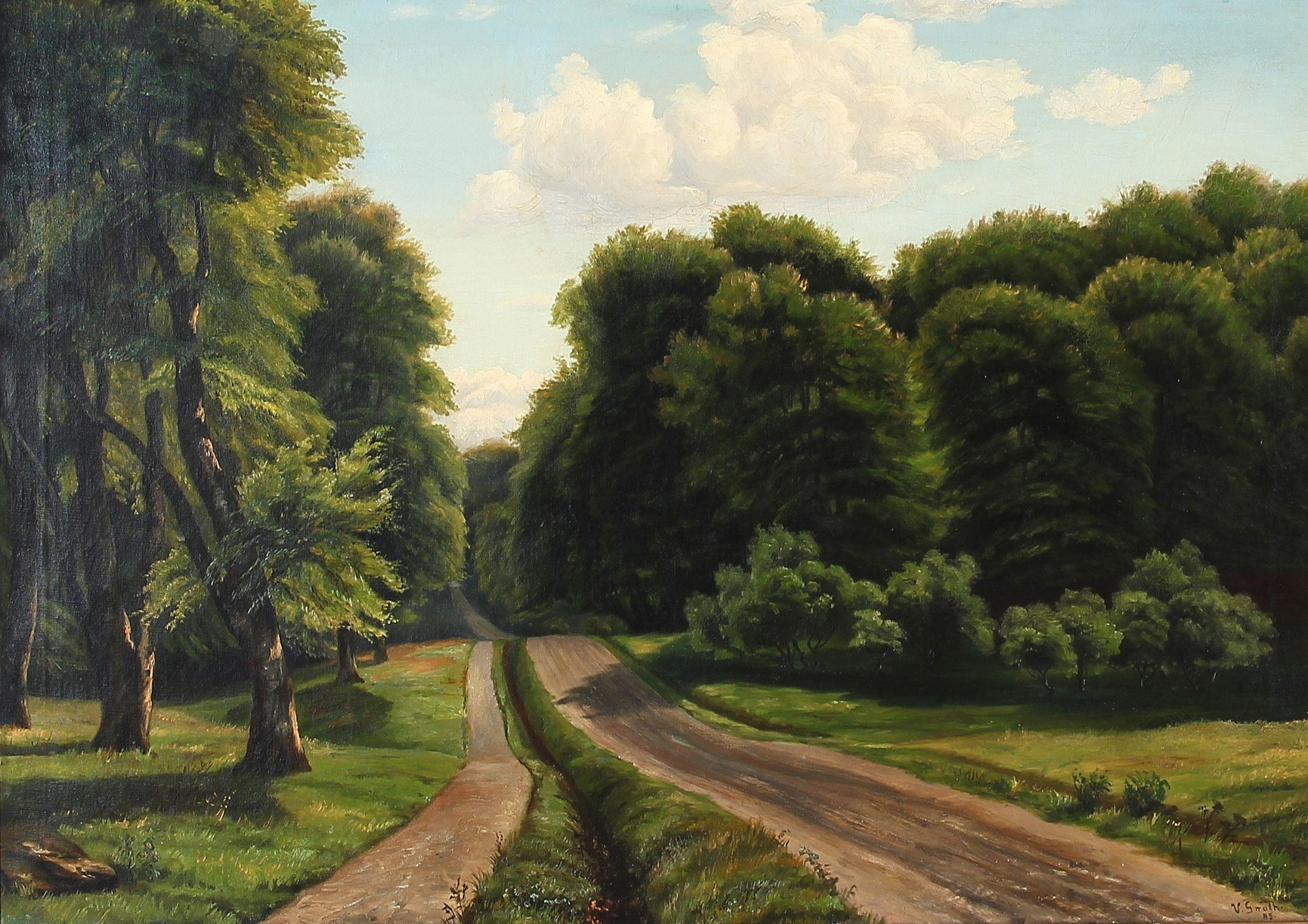
Summer Day on a Forest Road

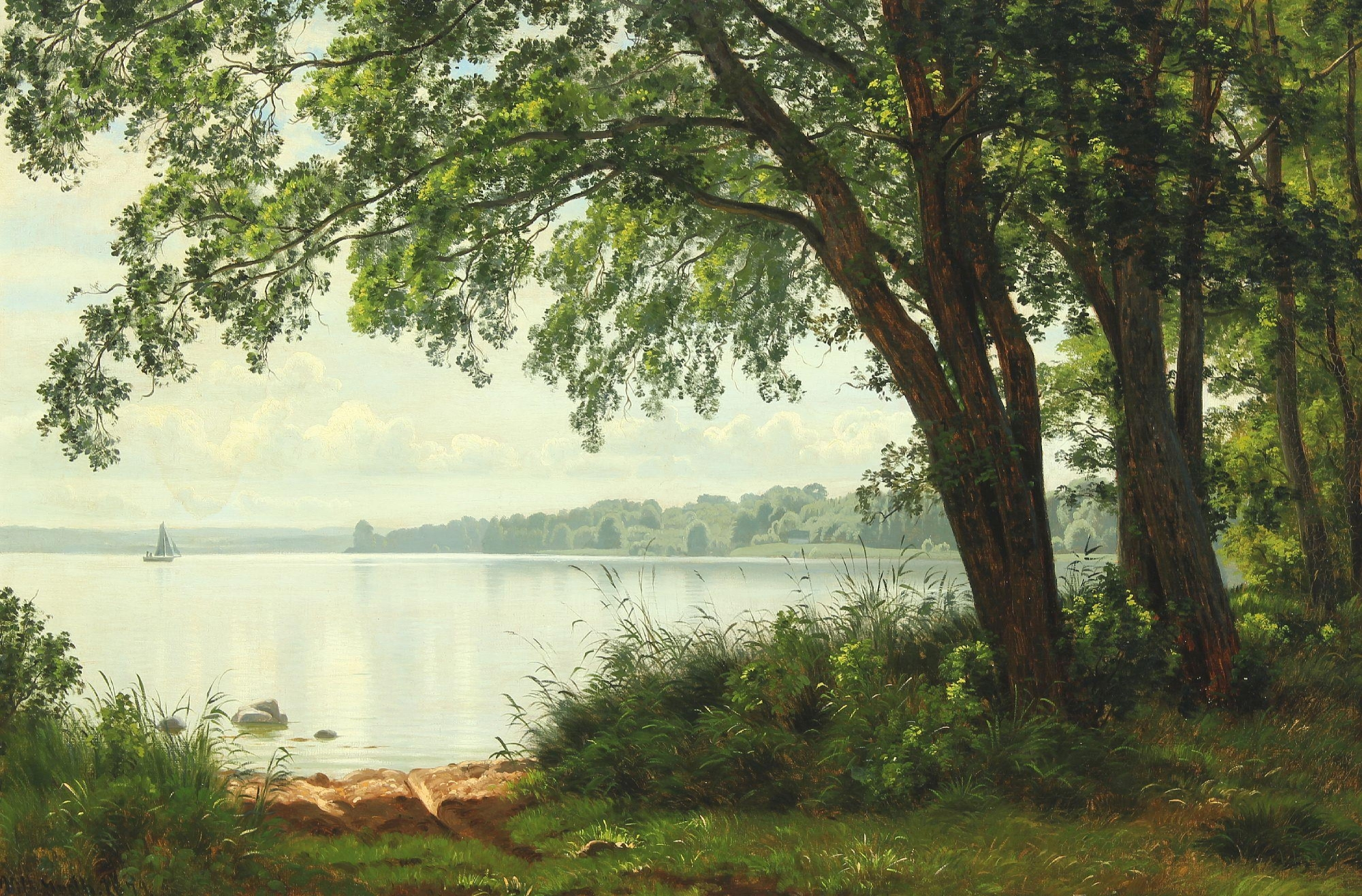
Quiet Day on the Northern Part of
Lake Esrum
