= Rosing (surname) =

Rosing or Rösing is a surname of Danish and German origin. Notable people with the surname include:

- Astrid Rosing Sawyer (1874–1954), Danish businesswoman
- Bernhard Rösing (1866–1947), German admiral
- Bodil Rosing (1877–1941), Danish actor
- Boris Rosing (1869–1933), Russian scientist and inventor of television
- Emilie Rosing (1783–1811), Danish singer and actress
- Fredrik Rosing Bull (1882–1925), Norwegian scientist
- Hans Rosing (1625–1699), Norwegian clergyman
- Hans-Pavia Rosing (1948–2018), Greenlandic politician and civil servant
- Hans-Rudolf Rösing (1905–2004), German military commander
- Hedevig Rosing (1827–1913), Danish-Norwegian educator and suffragist
- Helmut Rösing (born 1943), German musicologist
- Janette Rosing (1942–2021), British antiquarian, art and photograph collector
- Jens Rosing (1925–2008), Danish-Greenlandic artist
- Johanne Rosing (1756–1823), Danish actress and ballet dancer
- Karoline Rosing (c. 1842–1901), Greenlandic midwife and translator
- Lars Rosing (born 1972), Danish-Greenlandic actor, brother of Otto Rosing
- Leonard A. Rosing (1861–1909), American politician
- Linda Thelenius (also known as Linda Rosing; born 1974), Swedish model and singer
- Michael Rosing (1756–1818), Norwegian-Danish actor
- Niels Rosing-Schow (born 1954), Danish composer
- Nivi Rosing (born 2003), Greenlandic politician
- Norbert Rosing (born 1953), German photographer
- Otto Rosing (born 1967), Danish-Greenlandic film director
- Tajana Rosing, American computer scientist
- Val Rosing (1910–1969), British singer
- Vladimir Rosing (1890–1963), Russian-born opera singer and stage director
- Wayne Rosing (born 1946), American engineering manager

== See also ==
- Rosing (disambiguation)
