= Pilestræde 39 =

Listed building in Copenhagen

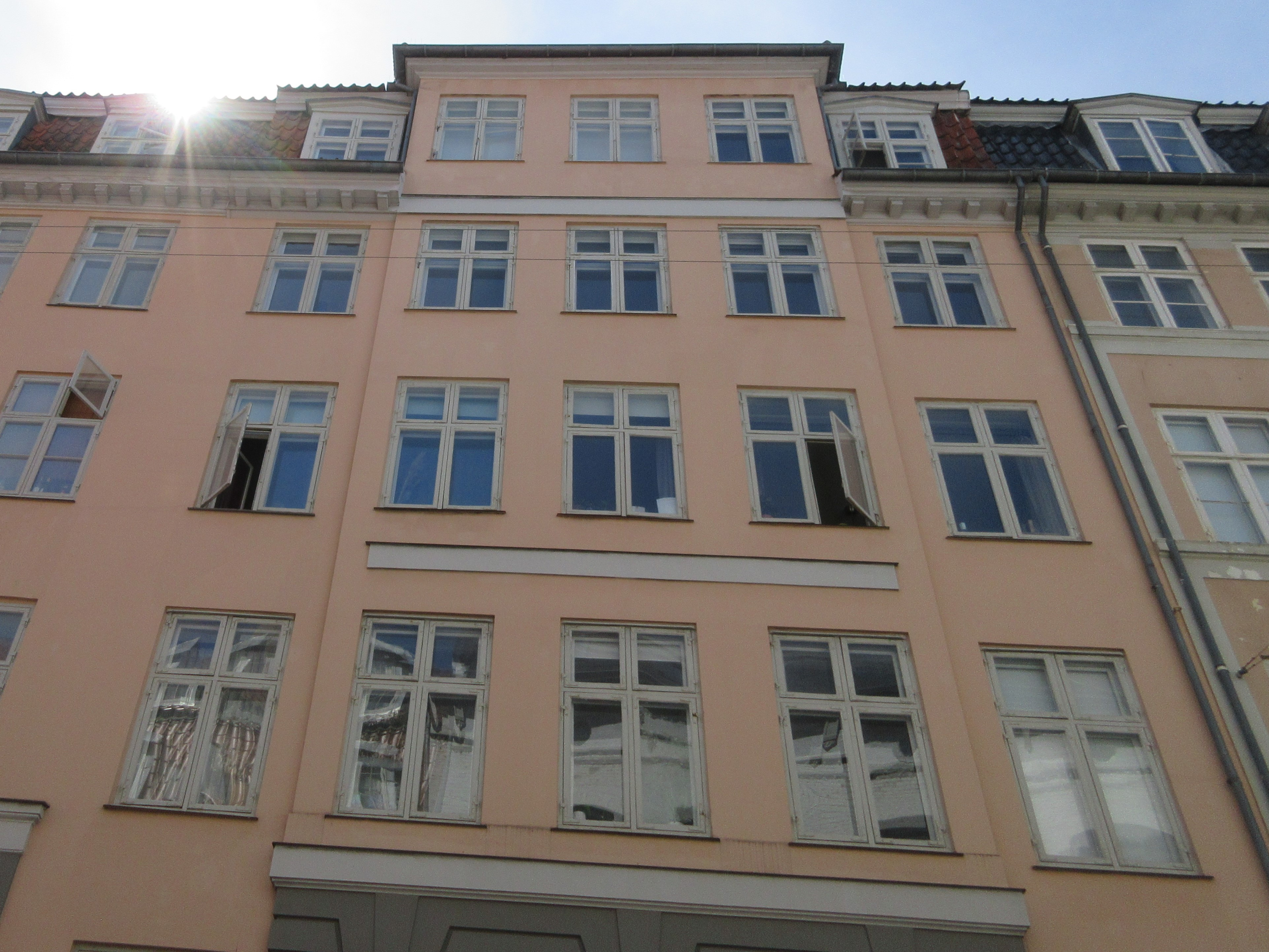

General information
- Architectural style: Neoclassical
- Location: Copenhagen, Denmark
- Coordinates: 55°40′51.78″N 12°34′46.27″E
- Completed: 1786

Pilestræde 39 is a late 18th-century building situated in Pilestræde in the Old Town of Copenhagen, Denmark. It was constructed by the master mason and developer Johan Peter Boye Junge, who also constructed the buildings at Pilestræde 37 and Pilestræde 41–45 in conjunction with his creation of the street Kronprinsensgade. It was listed in the Danish registry of protected buildings and places in 1945. The scope of the heritage listing was expanded in 1992. Jacob Trier's grocery business was for more than one hundred years—from the late 1840s until at least the 1950s—based in the building. Notable former residents include actors Joachim-Daniel Preisler (1755–1809) and Marie Cathrine Preisler (1761–1797) and painter Christian August Lorentzen (1749–1828).

== History ==
=== Site history, 1689–1783 ===
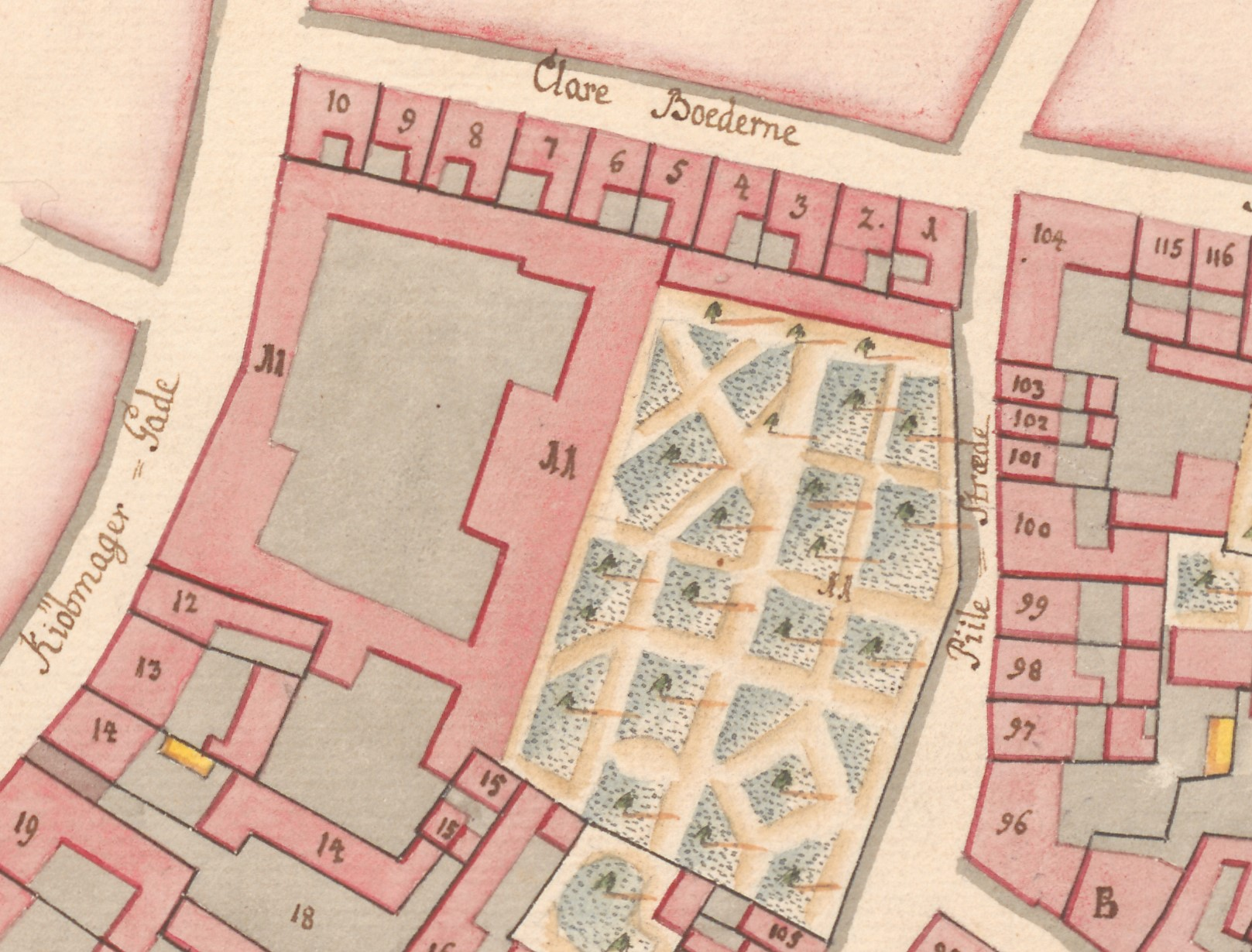
No. 11 seen on a detail from Christian Gedde's map of Købmager Quarter, 1757.

The site was formerly part of a much larger property, listed in Copenhagen's first cadastre of 1689 as No. 14 in Købmager Quarter. On 24 July 1672, it was sold at auction to storkansler Conrad von Reventlow (1644–1708). After his death in 1708, the property was passed to his son Christian Detlev Reventlow (1671–1738). The buildings were destroyed in the Copenhagen Fire of 1728 but subsequently rebuilt. Christian Ditlev Reventlow owned the property until his death. It was passed to his son Christian Ditlev Reventlow after his death.

The property was listed in the new cadastre of 1756 as No. 11 in Købmager Quarter. It was referred to as Reventlow's Hotel at that time. A large four-winged building complex surrounding a central courtyard occupied the half of the property that faced the more prominent street Købmagergade. The half of the property that faced the quieter street Pilestræde was the site of a large garden complex. A row of small properties separated the property from Klareboderne in the northwest.

=== Boye Junge and the new building ===
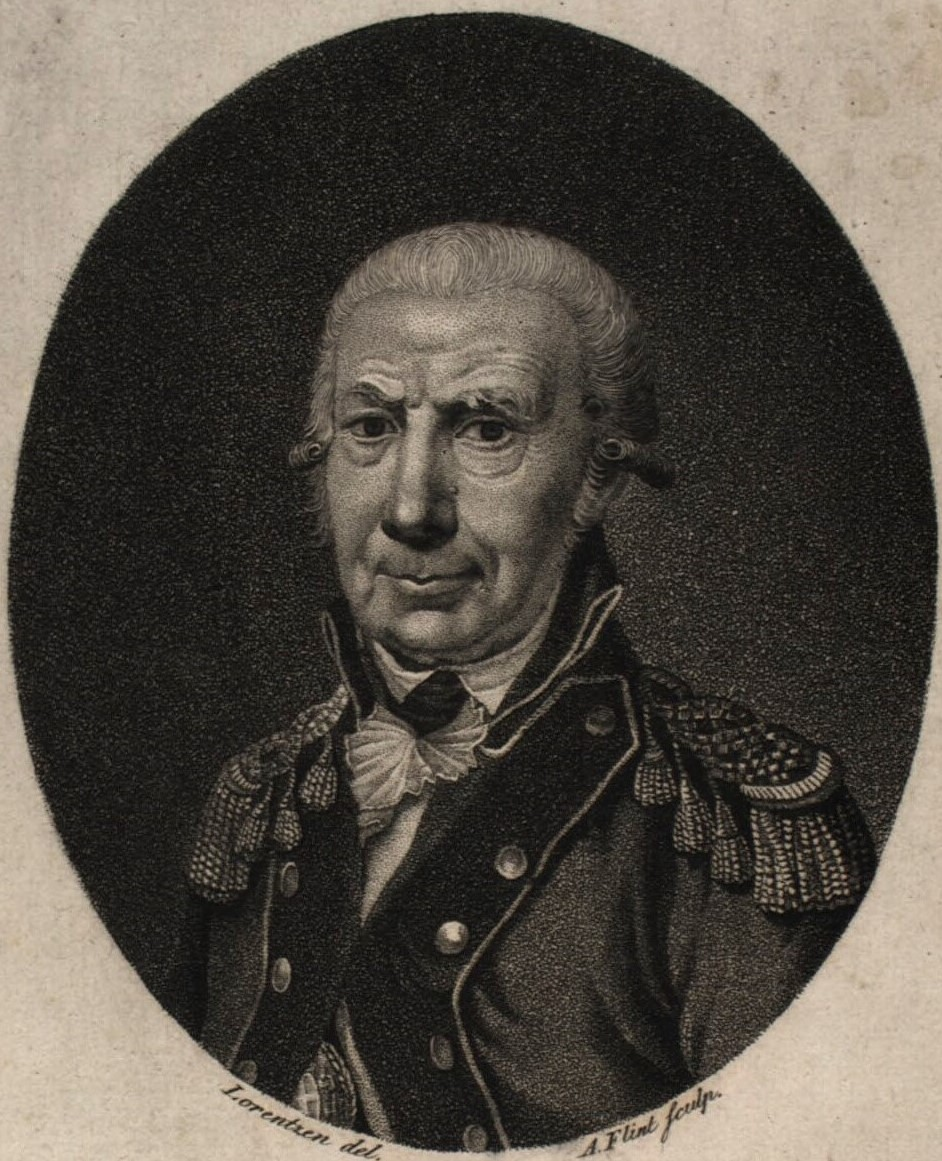
Johan Peter Boye Junge

In 1783 the property was acquired by the master builder Johan Peter Boye Junge (1735–1807), who was shortly thereafter granted royal permission to establish the new street Kronprinsensgade on the land. Boye Junge was one of the largest private employers in Copenhagen of his time.

The building now known as Pilestræde 39 was constructed by Boye Junge between 1784 and 1786. At the same time, he was working on the two adjacent buildings now known as Pilestræde 37 and Pilestræde 41. On their completion in 1786, he went on to construct the adjacent buildings at Pilestræde 43–45. He also constructed the buildings around the corner at Kronprinsensgade 4–6 and 11, Kronprinsensgade 2/Købmagergade 34 and Købmagergade 32.

=== 1896–1807 ===
The actors Joachim-Daniel Preisler (1755–1809) and Marie Cathrine Preisler (1761–1797) resided in one of the apartments of the building from 1789 to 1792.

The painter Christian August Lorentzen (1749–1828) resided in one of the apartments from 1802 to 1805. He was appointed as a professor at the Royal Danish Academy of Fine Arts in 1803.

The property was listed in the new cadastre of 1806 as No. 83 in Købmager Quarter. It was owned by one assessor Horn at that time.

=== 1845 census ===
The property was home to 24 residents at the 1845 census. Jørgen Graversen, a barkeeper, resided on the ground floor with his wife Marie Margrethe Graversen, their two children (aged seven and eight) and one maid. Christian Udmar Bruun, a choreographer at the Royal Danish Theatre, resided on the first floor with his wife Engel Marie Bruun and one maid. Cecilie Isaacsen, an unmarried woman with means, was also residing on the first floor. Joseph Simonsen, a silk and textile merchant, resided on the second floor with his wife Dorothea Simonsen and one maid. Johan Ludevig Mohr, a musician in the Royal Danish Orchestra, resided on the third floor with his wife Caroline Olivia Mohr, their three children (aged seven to 14) and one maid. Rebecka Friedlænder, a widow, resided on the fourth floor with three unmarried daughters (aged 24 to 31) and one maid. Georg Julius Hauch Bentzen, a captain in the 1st Infantry Battalion, resided on the fifth floor.

=== Trier family ===
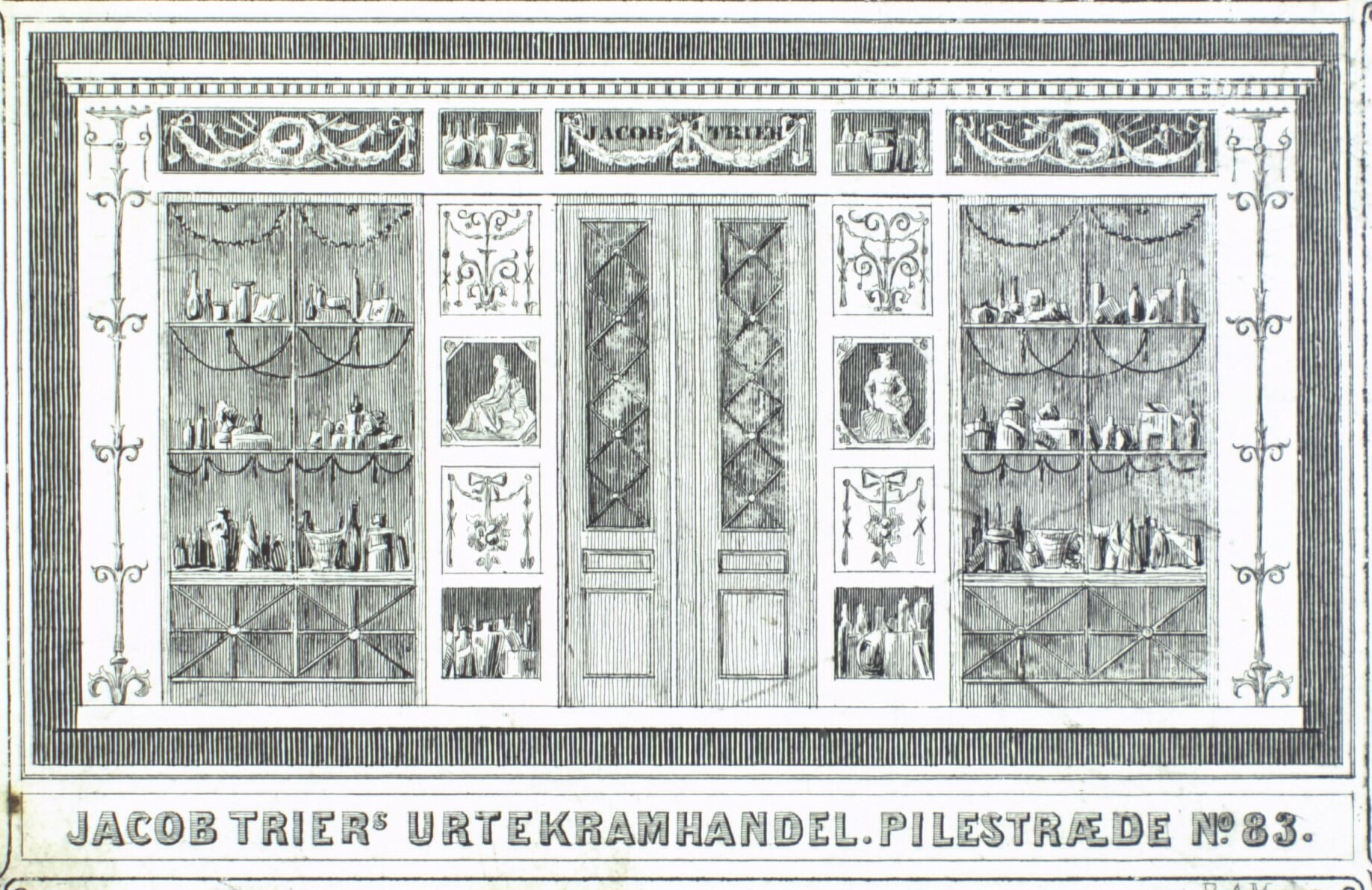
Advert for Jacob Trier's shop,

The grocer Jacob Trier (1811–1884) purchased the property in the late 1840s. He had just sold the neighboring building at No. 84 (now Pilestræde 37) to bookseller Meyer Herman Bing.

Trier's building was home to six households at the 1860 census. Trier resided on the ground floor with his wife Cecilie (née David), their four children (aged four to 13), his sister-in-law Sophie David, a grocer (urtekræmmersvend), a grocer's apprentice and three maids. Sophie Caroline Lund, a widow employed with needlework, resided on the first floor with master tanner Ditlef Fred. Gram, barkeeper Mads Petersen, Petersen wife Dorthea Petersen and their 13-year-old daughter. Sara Speyer (née Simonsen), widow of district physician (stiftsfysikus) in Ringkøbing Carl Ludvig Speyer, resided on the third floor with her three children (aged 11 to 22). Frederik Ruff (1819–1883), a former ballet dancer at the Royal Danish Ballet, resided on the fourth floor with his wife Frederikke Ruff (1820–1903) and their three children (aged 11 to 19). They would later move to Nyhavn 42.

The property was home to 24 residents at the 1880 census. Jacob Trier resided on the two bottom floors of his building with his daughter Louise Sophie Trier, two employees in his grocery business, one apprentice, one male servant and two maids. Vilhelm Berggreen, proprietor of a laundry, resided on the third floor with his wife Signe Berggreen, their six-year-old son Alvilda Christine Berggreen, two lodgers and one maid. Bernhard Philipsen, a wholesale merchant (grosserer), resided on the fourth floor with his wife Fanny Esperana Philipsen, their daughter Ludviga Bertha Philipsen and one maid. Emil Jørgensen, a lithographer, resided on the fifth floor with his wife Anne Jørgensen, their 19th-year-old son Ernst Jørgensen (tailor), sculptor Lauritz Gebauer Hansen (1851–1908) and musician Frederik Qendin Hansen.

Jacob Trier died in 1884. The property was then passed to his son Laurits Julius Trier. He also continued the family firm under its old name. In 1919, it was acquired by Johannes P. Jarding (born 1873) and continued as Jacob Trier's Eftf. ('Jacob Trier's Successor'). Jacob Trier's Eftf. was still based at Pilestræde 39 in 1950.

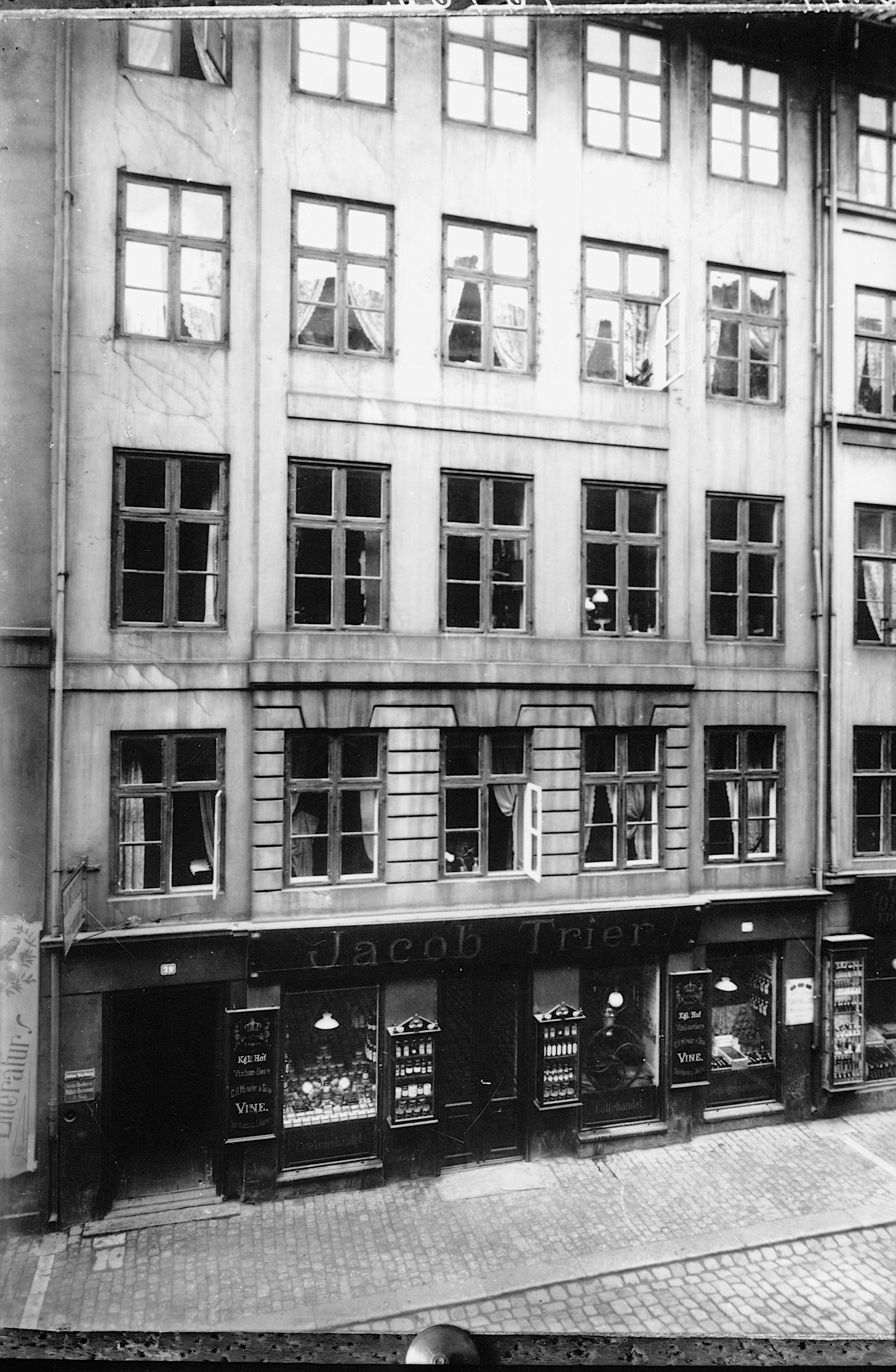
The building photographed by Peter Elfelt in 1918.

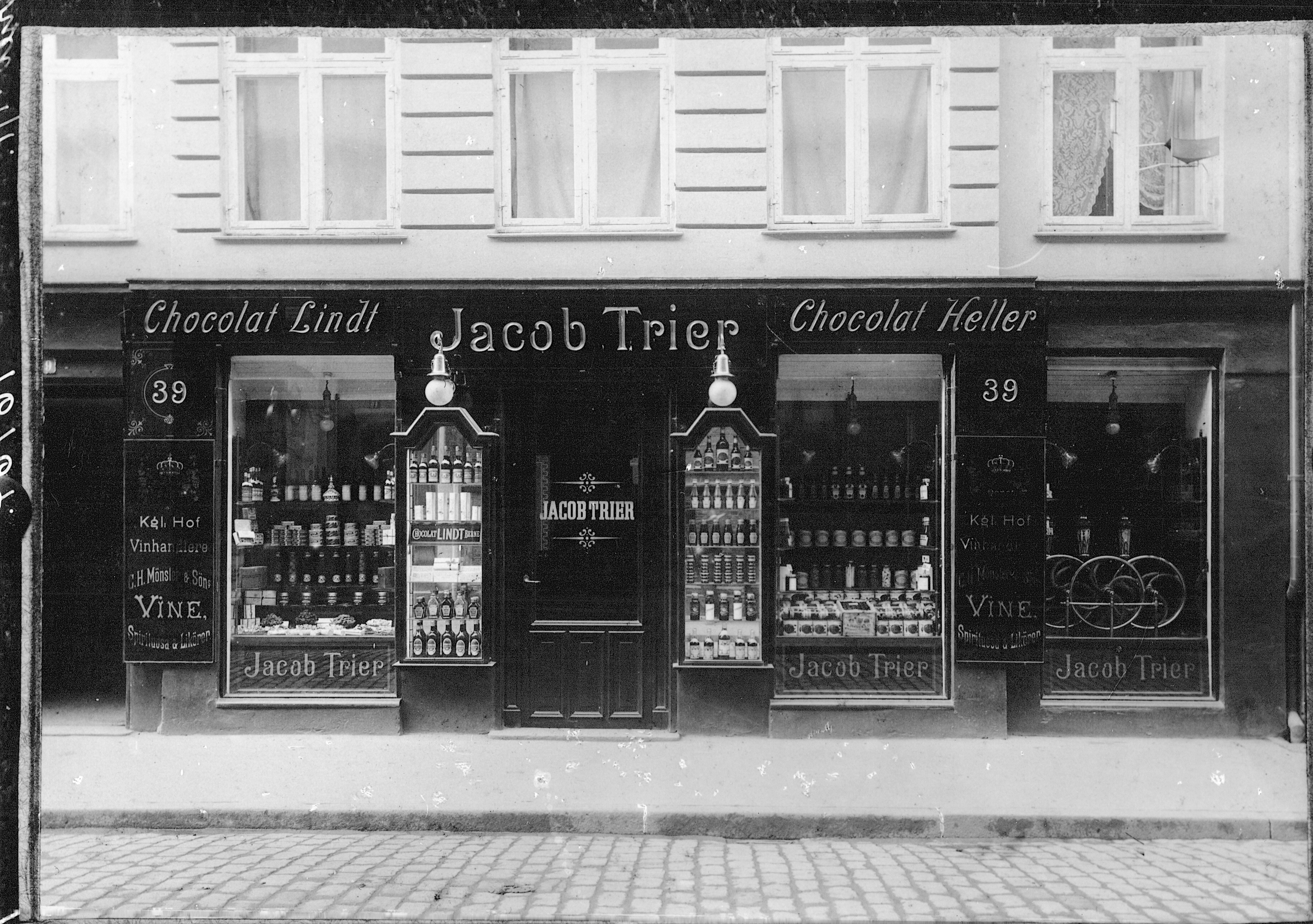
Facade of the shop photographed by Peter Elfelt in 1918.

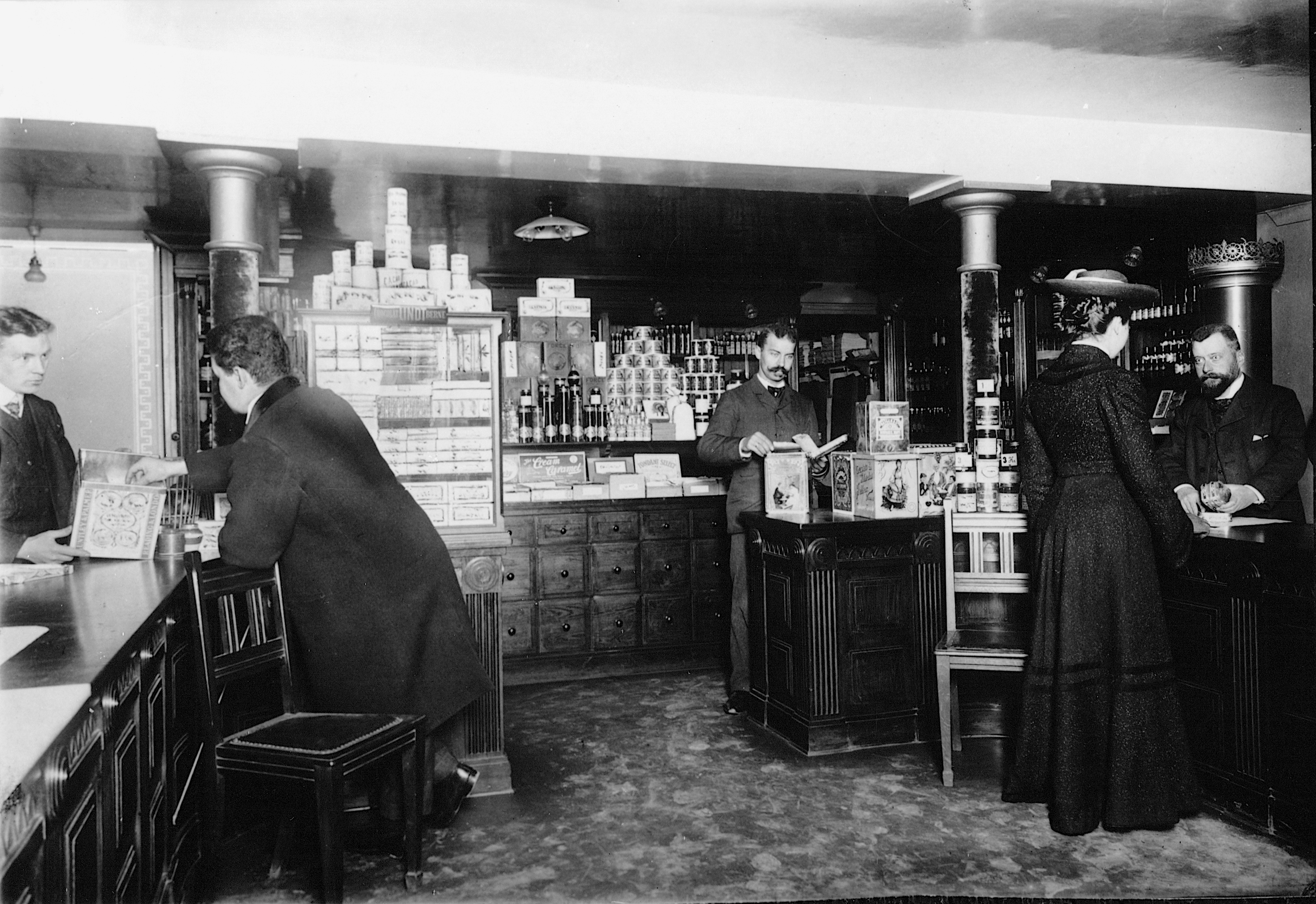
Interior of the shop photographed by Peter Elfelt in 1918.

== Architecture ==
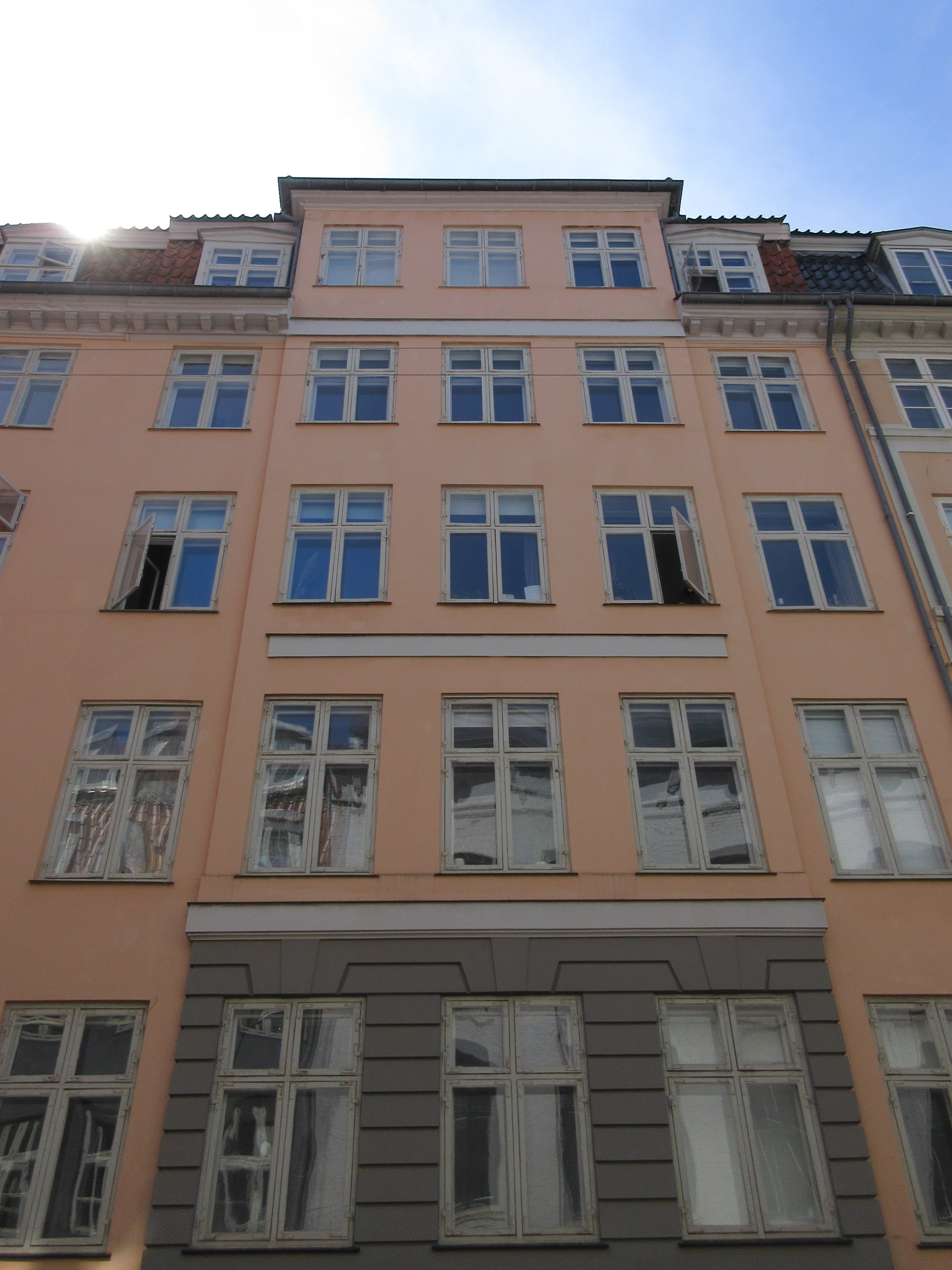
Pilestræde 39.

The four individual buildings at Pilestræde 39–45 are all five storeys tall, making them one storey taller than the norm for apartment buildings at their time of construction. Their plastered and grey-painted facades leave a homogeneous impression, together with those of the adjacent buildings at Pilestræde 37–39, although details of their facades vary. The three central bays of Pilestræde 39 form a slightly projecting median risalit crowned by a three-bay wall dormer in the mansard roof. The median risalit is accented with a dentillated belt cornice above the ground floor, shadow joints on the first floor, a blank frieze above the second floor and a dentillated cornice below the roof. The dentiallated cornice continues across the three-bay wall dormer as a blank frieze. The main entrance is located in the bay furthest to the left. It opens to an anteroom which continues through the building. A three-bay-long side wing extends from the rear side of the building along one side of a central courtyard bounded by Pilestræde 37 and Kronprinsensgade 11 on its other sides. The side wing has a monopitched roof, complemented by the monopitched roof of the adjoining side wing of Pilestræde 41. The rear side of the front wing and the facade of the side wing are painted yellow, with green-painted windows.

== Today ==
Pilestræde 39 and Pilestræde 37 are now part of the same property. It is today owned by Jeudan.
