= Pilestræde 37 =

Listed building in Copenhagen

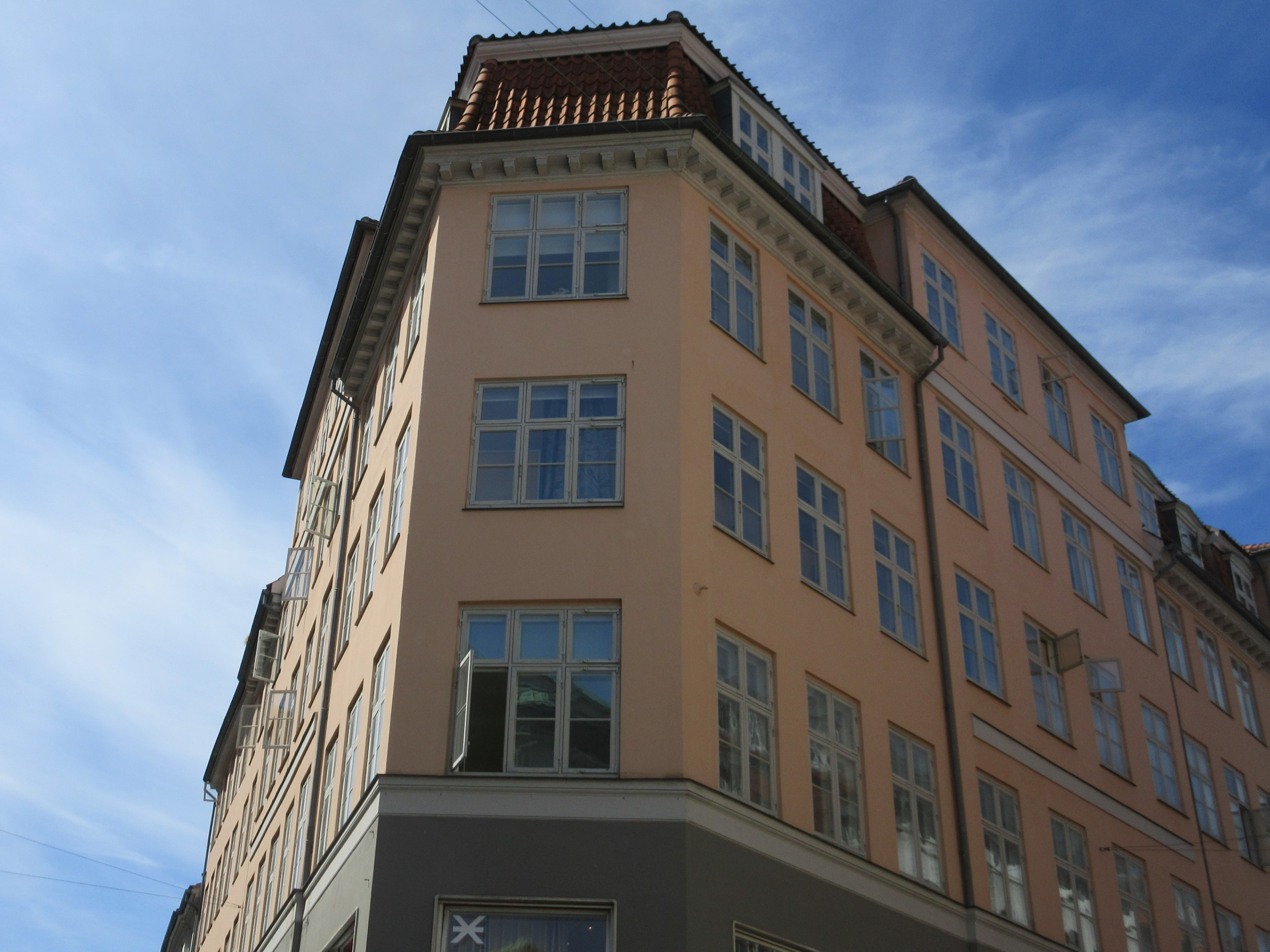

General information
- Architectural style: Neoclassical
- Location: Copenhagen, Denmark
- Coordinates: 55°40′51.2″N 12°34′46.92″E
- Completed: 1784-1786

Design and construction
- Architect: Johan Peter Boye Junge

Pilestræde 37/Kronprinsensgade 13 is an 18th-century building situated at the acute-angled corner of Pilestræde and Kronprinsensgade in the Old Town of Copenhagen, Denmark. It was listed in the Danish registry of protected buildings and places in 1945. It was constructed by the master mason and developer Johan Peter Boye Junge, who also constructed the buildings at Pilestræde 39–47 in conjunction with his creation of the street Kronprinsensgade, and who was himself a resident of the building from its completion in 1786. Other notable former residents include actors Michael and Johanne Rosing, printer Andreas Flinch, poet Christian Winther and Bing & Grøndahl co-founder Meyer Herman Bing.

== History ==
=== Site history, 1689–1783 ===
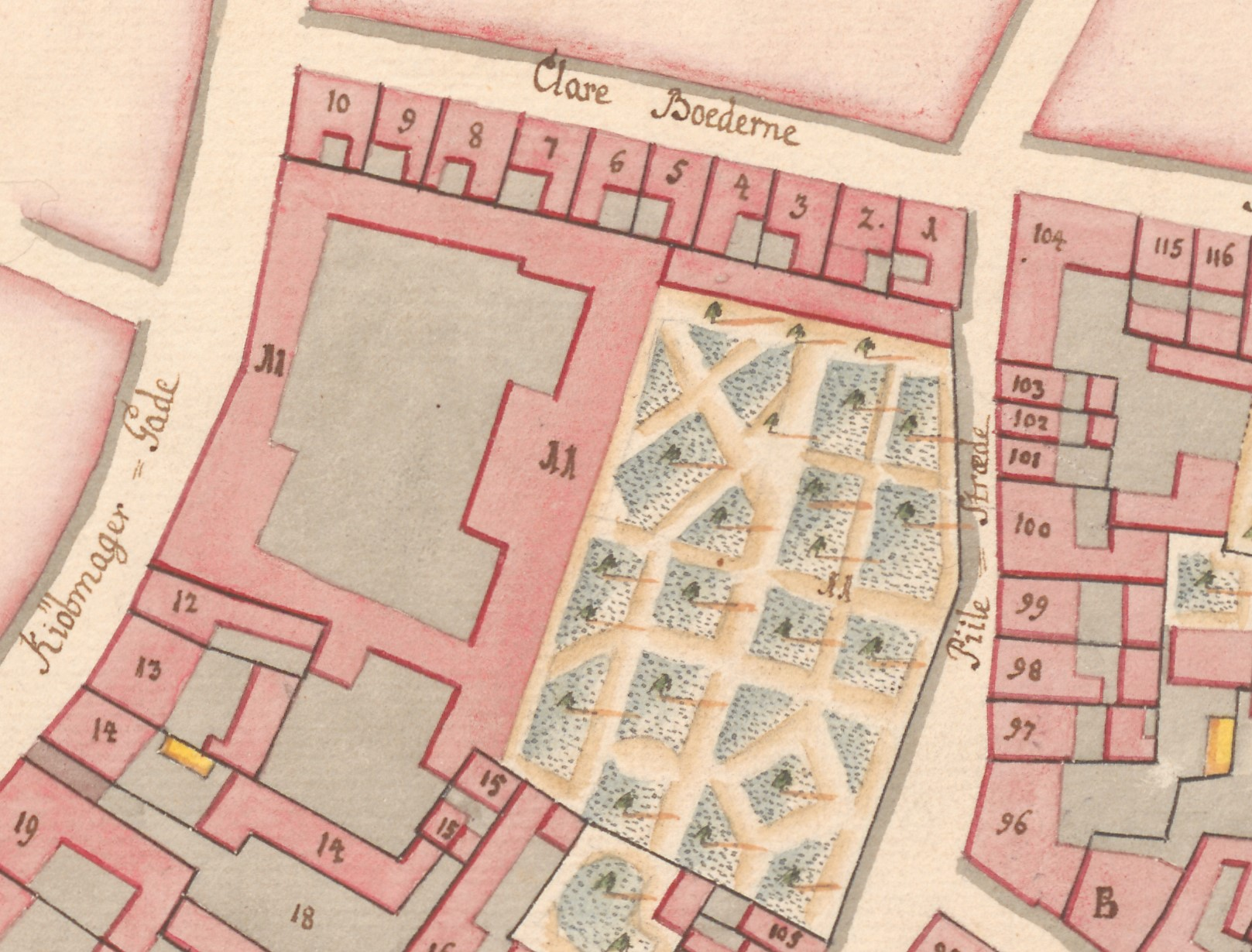
No. 11 seen on a detail from Christian Gedde's map of Købmager Quarter, 1757.

The site was formerly part of a much larger property, listed in Copenhagen's first cadastre of 1689 as No. 14 in Købmager Quarter. On 24 July 1672, it was sold at auction to storkansler Conrad von Reventlow (1644–1708). After his death in 1708, the property was passed to his son Christian Detlev Reventlow (1671–1738). The buildings were destroyed in the Copenhagen Fire of 1728 but subsequently rebuilt. Christian Ditlev Reventlow owned the property until his death. It was passed to his son Christian Ditlev Reventlow after his death.

The property was listed in the new cadastre of 1756 as No. 11 in Købmager Quarter. It was referred to as Reventlow's Hotel at that time. A large four-winged building complex surrounding a central courtyard occupied the half of the property that faced the more prominent street Købmagergade. The half of the property that faced the quieter street Pilestræde was the site of a large garden complex. A row of small properties separated the property from Klareboderne in the northwest.

=== Boye Junge and the new building ===
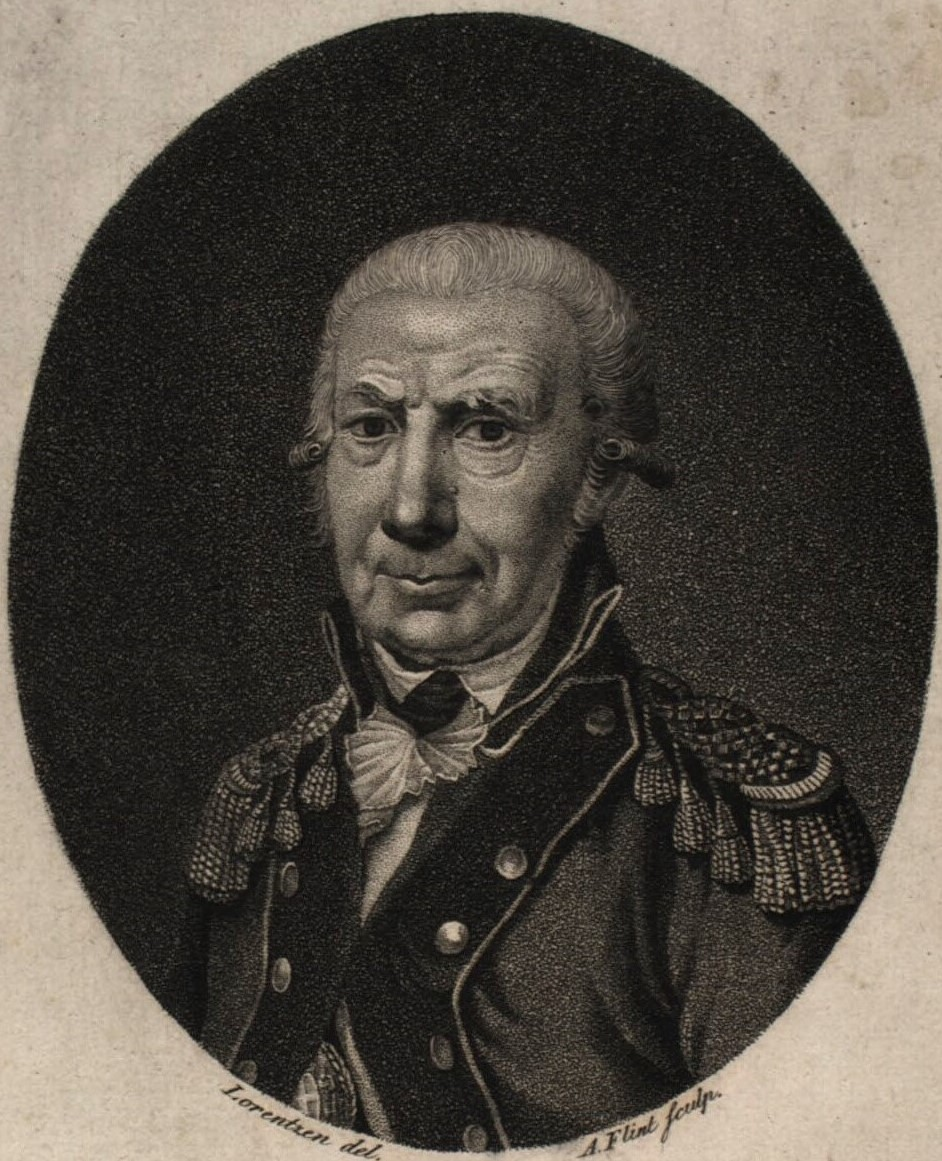
Johan Peter Boye Junge

In 1783 the property was acquired by the master builder Johan Peter Boye Junge (1735–1807), who was shortly thereafter granted royal permission to establish the new street Kronprinsensgade on the land. Boye Junge was one of the largest private employers in Copenhagen of his time.

Boye Junge constructed the corner building between 1784 and 1786. At the same time, he was working on the two adjacent buildings now known as Pilestræde 39 and Pilestræde 41. On their completion in 1786, he went on to construct the adjacent buildings at Pilestræde 43–45. He also constructed Kronprinsensgade 4–6 and 11, Kronprinsensgade 2/Købmagergade 34 and Købmagergade 32.

=== 1786–1810 ===
Boye Junge was himself a resident of one of the apartments in the corner building from its completion in 1786. He lived there with his wife Birgitta (née Magens, 1743–1815). The couple moved four houses down the street to Pilestræde 45 in 1797.

The actors Michael (1756–1818) and Johanne Rosing (née Olsen, 1756–1853) resided in the building towards Pilestræde from 1788 to 1797 and again from c. 1800–1801 to 1811. In the meantime they had spent a few years first at Kronprinsensgade 14 and then at Gammel Strand 38 (demolished). In 1811, Michael and Johanne Rosing moved to a now demolished building at Kronprinsessegade 50.

Prior to the 1801 census, the property was sold to restaurateur Henning Hadeler. He resided on the ground floor with his wife Margrethe Hadeler (née Holm), their 13-year-old daughter Johanne Kirstine Hadeler, one male servant and three maids. Johan Casper Theodor Wewer, a businessman (stadsmægler), resided in the building with his wife Anne Christine Jacobsen, their five children (aged 10 to 22) and two maids. Christian Wilhelm Lange, a government official with the title of justitsråd, resided in the building with his wife Anne Holck Heuenkirken, their two children (aged eight and 11), two daughters from his wife's first marriage (aged 15 and 19), a caretaker and a maid. Michael and Johanne Rossing resided in the building with their eight children (aged eight to 19) and one maid. Nicolai Pelt, a bookdealer, resided in the building with his wife Johanne Christence Pelt, their two-year-old daughter Sophie Pelt and one maid. Levin Meyer, a merchant, resided in the building with his wife Sara Davids, their two children (aged one and two) and two maids.

The corner building was listed in the new cadastre of 1806 as No. 84 in Købmager Quarter. It was still owned by Hadeler at that time. He was then referred to as a billiard holder.

=== Trier family ===
The building was at some point acquired by grocer (urtekræmmer) M. G. Trier. After his death in 1838, the property was passed on to his son Jacob Trier.

Jacob Trier's property was home to 51 residents in eight households at the 1840 census. Jacob Trier resided on the ground floor with two grocers (employees, one of them his brother Adolph Trier), one grocer's apprentice, one male servant, a housekeeper and two maids. Ahron Jacobsen, a glass merchant, resided on the same floor with his sister Sophie Jacobsen and two maids. Esther Trier, Jacob Trier's mother, resided on the first floor with four unmarried daughters (aged 22 to 31), one maid and two lodgers. Andreas Unsgaard (1800–1842), a civil servant (kontorchef) with title of etatsråd), resided on the second floor with his wife Metteline Unsgaard (née Kradt, 1800–1894), his wife's sister Engelcke Kraft, his own mother Bertha Unsgaard (1764–1864) and two maids. Andreas Flinch, a xylographer, resided on the third floor with his wife Marie Sophie, five lodgers and one maid. A. (O) Hertss, a tutor (institutbystyrer), resided on the fourth floor with three pupils aged 15 to 18, two other lodgers and one maid. F. J. Herligstedt, a master tailor, resided on the same floor with his wife Augusta Andrea, their two children (aged four and 11) and one maid. Anders Christensen, who worked at the Royal Danish Theatre, resided in the garret with his wife Bergithe and their two children (aged one and seven).

The poet Christian Winther was a resident of the building in 1843. Døtreskolen af 1791, Copenhagen's oldest girls' school, was based in the building from 1844 to 1849.

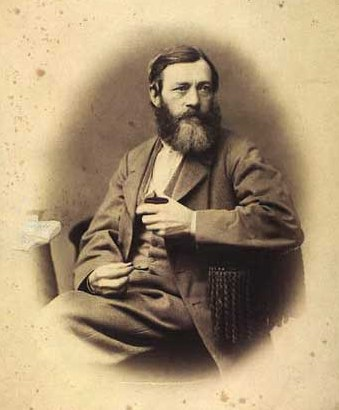
Andreas Flinch

Trier's property was again home to 51 residents at the time of the 1845 census. Jacob Trier resided on the first floor with his wife Cecilie Frederike (née David), one grocer (employee), one grocer's apprentice, one male servant, one maid and the widow Louise Augusta Custonier. Karen Mammen, a teacher, resided in Døtreskolen's apartment on the second floor with one maid. Andreas Wagner, a pastry baker (konditor) with alcohol license, resided on the same floor with his wife Magdalene Sørensen, their two daughters (aged 10 and 12), one male servant and one maid. Morten Henrik Otto Møller, a barkeeper, resided on the same floor with his wife Henriette Bennedicte Rohmark, their six-year-old daughter and one maid. Andreas Flinch, who was now registered as a lithographer and had also started publishing Flinch's Almanak, resided on the third floor with his wife Marie Sophie Flinch, their three children (aged one to four) and two maids. Marie Møller, an unmarried woman with a pension, shared the other third floor apartment with the widow Anne Johanne Marie Kaufmann and the unmarried woman Andreas Christian Frederik Flinch. Søren Jacob Worm, a silk and textile merchant, resided on the fourth floor with his wife Thora Laurenta Worm, their two-year-old daughter, a widow with a six-year-old daughter, two students and two maids. Friedrich Jacob Heiligerstädt, a master tailor, resided on the same floor with his wife Augusta Andrea Heiligerstädter, their eight-year-old son, one maid and the travelling salesman Julius Bentzen. Anders Christensen, a courier, resided in the garret with his wife Bergite (née Jagobsen) and their four children (aged two to 11).

Jacob Trier moved his home and business to the adjacent building No. 83 (now Pilestræde 39) when he sold the property fairly shortly thereafter. His former firm was still based at Pilestræde 39 in 1950.

=== Meyer Herman Bing ===
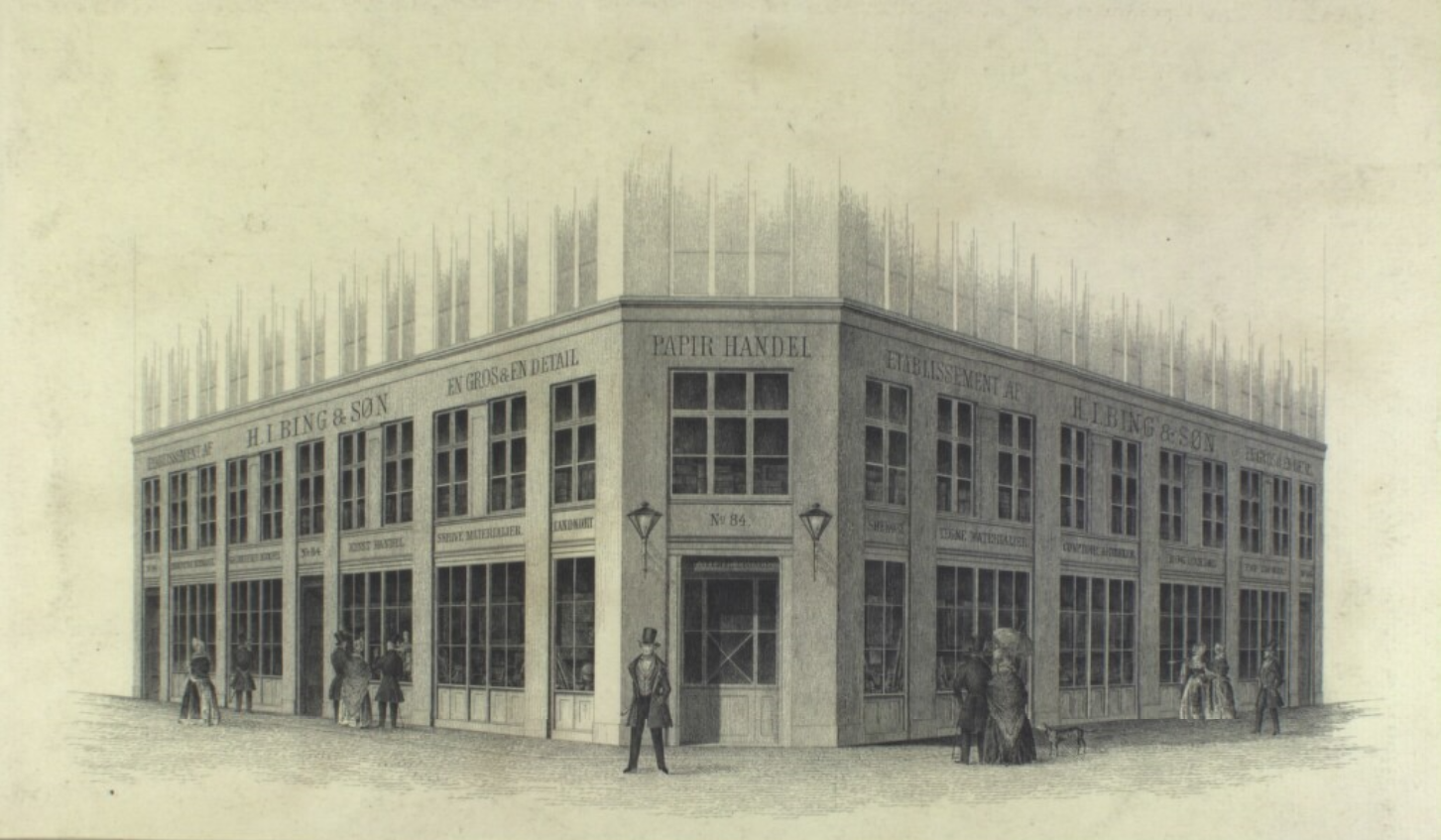
Bing's shop at the corner of Pilestgræde and Sværtegade

The bookseller Meyer Herman Bing (1807–1883) purchased the building from Trier in c. 1846–1848. He was a resident of the building from 1846 but Trier did not move his firm to No. 83 until 1848.

Bing and his brother Jacob Herman Bing were the proprietors of H. J. Bing & Søn, a bookshop started by their father. In 1848, he opened a combined art and gallantry shop on the ground floor of the building. It was recognized as the most elegant shop in Copenhagen and was even prior to its official opening visited by Christian VIII. It was one of the first shops in the city with street-level shop windows. Det Bingske Etablissement, as it was now called, was also publishing its own books. The previously founded lithographic workshop Bing & Ferslews lith. Etablissement was expanded with a book printing and stereotype business. This firm was in 1857 taken over by Jean Christian Ferslew and H. J. Bing & Søn was in 1863 ceded to Bing's son Jacob Martin Bing and son-in-law Benny Henriques.

In 1853, Meyer and Jacob Herman Bing founded the porcelain factory Bing & Grøndahl in partnership with Frederik Viihelm Grøndahl.

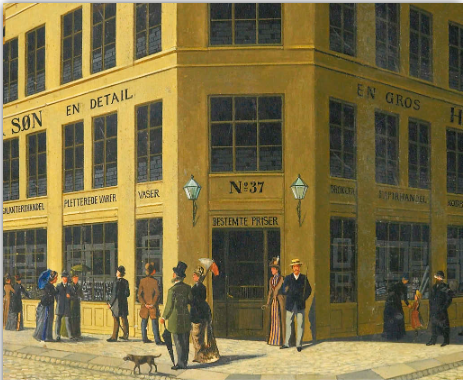
The building with the new house number. Detail from Bing's membership target donated to the Royal Copenhagen Shooting Society.

No. 84 was listed as Pilestræde 37/Kronprinsessegade 13 when house numbering (by street) was introduced as a supplement to the old cadastral numbers (by district) in 1859. The property was home to 22 residents at the 1880 census. Meyer Herman Bing resided on the second floor with his wife Eva Bing, their sons Frederik and Herman, one male servant, a husjomfru and two maids. Jacob Herman Bing resided on the third floor with his wife Henriette Bing, their son Harald, a husjomfru and two maids. Henriette Koppel, a widow, resided on the fourth floor with her daughters Regina (teacher) and Sophia, one maid and the visitor Charlotte Louise Theodora Petersen. Carl Friederick Vilhelm Hafnagel, a baker, resided in the garret with his wife Ane Marie Christine Hafnagel and their daughter-in-law Ane Henriette Glismann.

=== 20th century ===
The businessman Carl Mogensen rented the second-floor apartment in 1935. Back in 1926, he had taken over the import business Christian Rosenstand (Niels Brock 3). The company imported products from England, France and the Netherlands, including Worcester sauce, sardines, truffles, office supplies, pencils and paper articles. In the early 1930s, he and his friend Peter Freuchen founded the Danish Professional Boxing League. In 1937–1938, they established the Adventurers' Club of Denmark. Mogensen played an ambiguous role during World War II. He was active in the resistance group Lysglimt but was at the same time trading with the Germans. After the war he was investigated but all charges were dropped. In spring 1946, he was again investigated for his conduct during the occupation. On 11 April 1946, two policemen showed up at his home in Kronprinsensgade. He opened the door in his dressing gown and was allowed to dress in an adjacent room. The policemen heard two shots and found him shot with two gunshots in the head. He died on the way to the hospital.

== Architecture ==
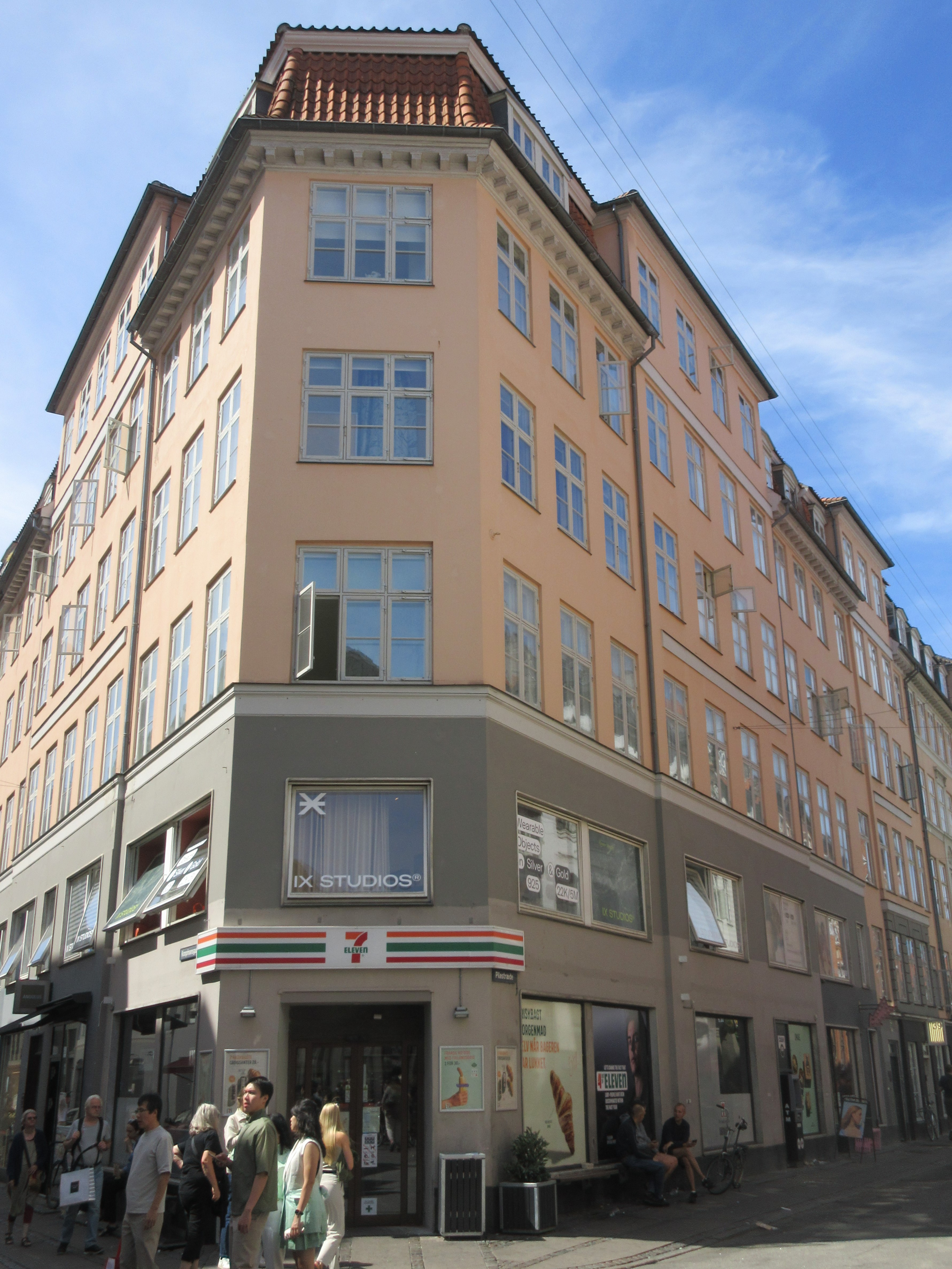
The building viewed from Pilestræde

Pilestræde 37/Kronprinsensgade 13 is a five-storey acute-angled corner building, with a 10-bay-long facade towards Pilestræde, an 11-bay-long facade towards Kronprinsensgade and a chamfered corner. The five central bays in Kronprinsensgade and the four central ones in Pilestræde form slightly projecting median risalits, both of which are topped by flat-roofed wall dormers. The facade is plastered and grey-painted on the two lower floors, while its upper part is finished with slightly pinkish plastering. The facade features a grey-painted sandstone band above the first floor and grey-painted friezes above the second- and fourth-floor windows of the two median risalits. The cornice is dentillated on its lateral parts but not on the median risalits. The mansard roof is clad in red tile. The building shares a small courtyard with the adjacent properties at Pilestræde 39 and Kronprinsensgade 11. The facades towards the yard are all plastered and yellow-painted.

== Today ==
There is a 7-Eleven shop on the ground floor and condominiums on the upper floors.
