= Rosing =

Rosing may refer to:

== Arts and entertainment ==
- Rachel Rosing, a 1935 novel by Howard Spring

== Awards ==
- Rosing Prize, a prize awarded to people who have made contributions to the Norwegian IT community

== People ==
- Rosing (surname), a list of people with the surname Rosing or Rösing

== Places ==
- Rosing Township, Morrison County, Minnesota, a township in the United States

== Other uses ==
- 22870 Rosing, a minor planet
- List of storms named Rosing, a list of storms with the same or similar names
