= Johan Boye Junge =

Danish carpenter (1735–1807)

Johan Peter Boye Junge
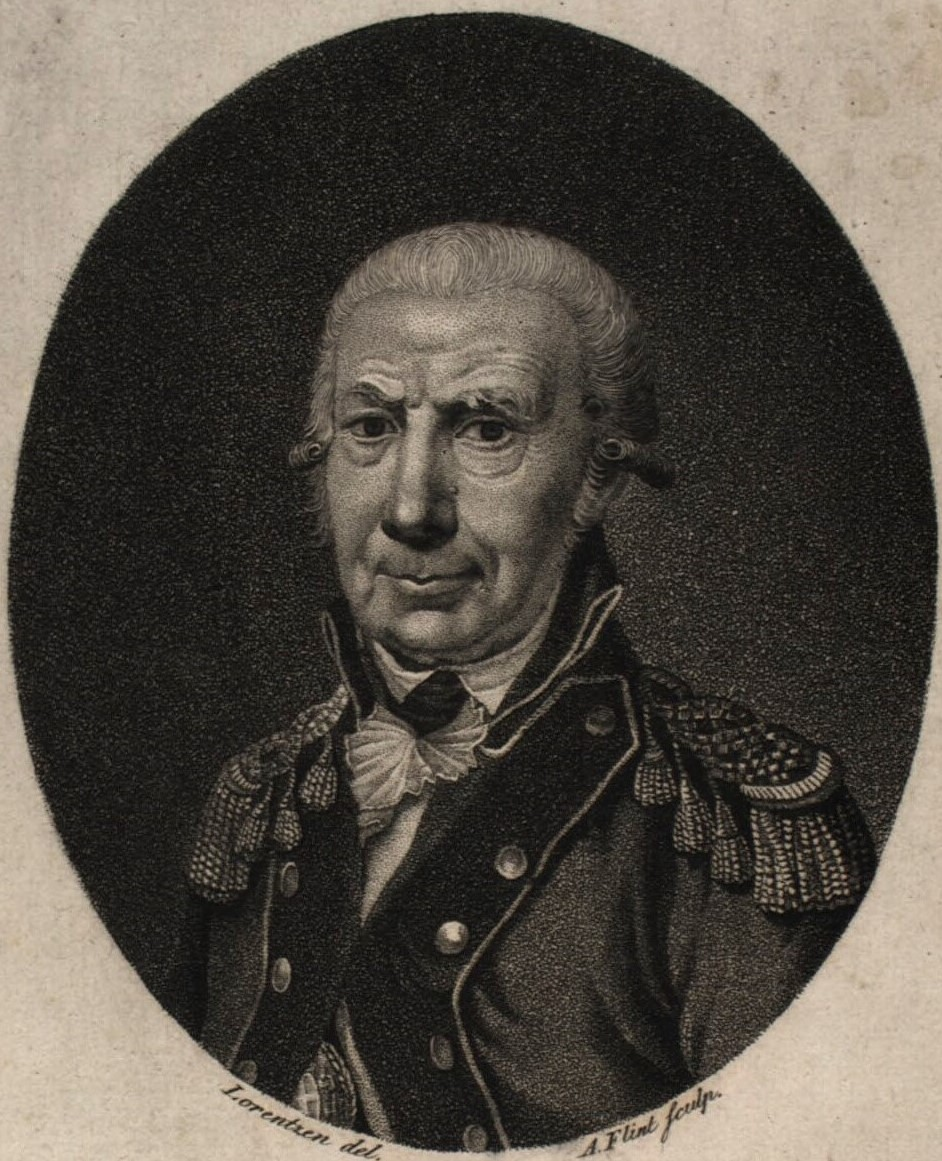
- Johan Peter Boye Junge by Andreas Flint-
- Born: 23 June 1735; Bramstedt, Duchy of Holstein
- Died: 22 February 1807 (aged 71); Copenhagen, Denmark

Johan Peter Boye Junge (23 June 1735 – 22 February 1807) was a Danish master carpenter, developer and head of the Copenhagen Fire Corps.

== Early life and education ==
Junge was born on 23 June 1735 in Bramstedt, Holstein, the son of Harm Junge and Maria Huckfeldt. Aged eight, he was sent to Copenhagen to live with his uncle, Johan Boye Junge (1697–1778), who had title of court master carpenter and served as deputy director of the city's fire corps. He was apprenticed to his uncle.

== Career ==
In 1759, Junge was granted citizenship as a master carpenter. His business grew steadily to a degree that made him one of the largest private employers in Copenhagen. In 1771, he was responsible for adapting the country house Frydenlund for Queen Caroline Mathilde. The next year, he was charged with constructing the scaffold used for the execution of Johan Friederich Struensee and Enevold Brandt.

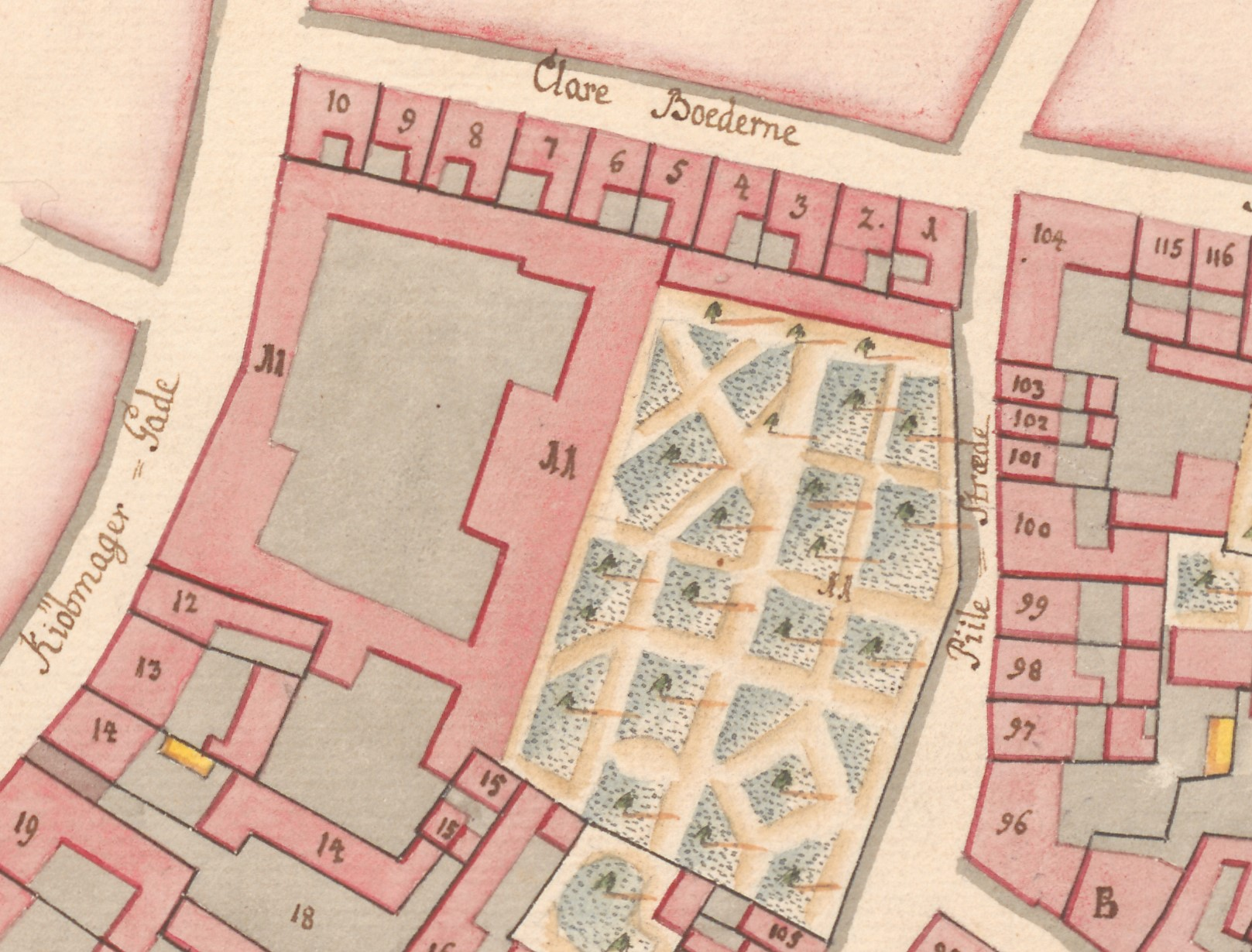
Reventlow's property (No. 11) seen on a detail from Christian Gedde's map of Købmager Quarter, 1757.

In 1793, he purchased a large property, Reventlow's Hotel, which reached all the way from Købmagergade in the west to Pilestræde in the east. He was shortly thereafter granted royal permission to establish the new street Kronprinsensgade on the land. He was also himself responsible for the redevelopment of most of the land with high-end apartment buildings. The buildings in Pilestræde were generally five stories tall, making them one story taller that what was normal in Copenhagen at the time.

In 1782–87, Junge, who was himself a member of the Royal Copenhagen Shooting Society, constructed its headquarters on Vesterbrogade.

In 1778, Junge became a first lieutenant in the 12th Civil Infantry Regiment. He was later promoted first to captain and later to head of the regiment. In 1787–96, he served first as major and then as director of the Copenhagen Fire Corps. He was thus in charge of the fire corps during the Fire of Christiansborg Palace in 1794 and the Copenhagen Fire of 1795 in June the following year. After the Great Fire of 1795, he was criticized for his efforts, but a commission acquitted him in 1809. By then he had already retired from his post as director of the fire corps due to poor health.

In 1789, he had submitted a proposal for the reorganization of Copenhagen's civil artillery. He was later responsible for implementing the plan, creating six companies, each with 35 paid officers and 1,026 junior officers and private soldiers. During the Battle of Copenhagen, on 2 April 1801, he was stationed at Quintus Battery. In 1803, together with general E. H. Stricker and the local magistrate, he was tasked with establishing a civil artillery and a fire corps in Helsingør. In 1804, he was by royal order appointed colonel of the infantry. In 1805, he was also appointed as royal director of Københavns Brandforsikring.

== Personal life ==
On 11 December 1761 in St. Peter's Church, Junge married Birgitte Magens (1743-1815). She was a daughter of master carpenter Johan Magens (ca. 1707–54) and Magdalene Wisse (c. 1701–65).

== List of works ==
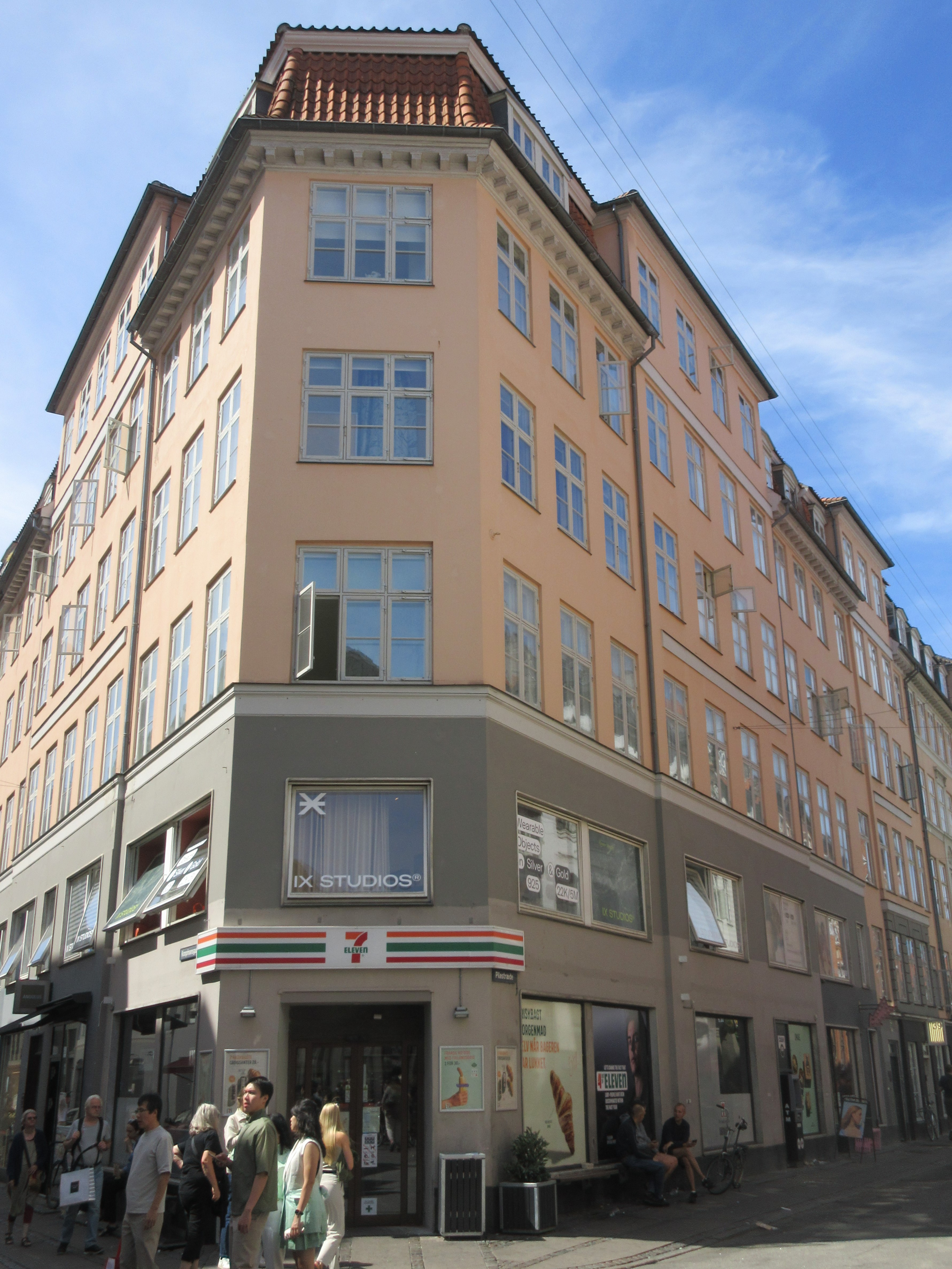
Pilestræde 38 in 2023

- Klareboderne 18 / Pilestræde 47 (between 1783 and 1790)
- Pilestræde 27 (1784–1786)
- Pilestræde 37 / Kronprinsensgade 13 (1784–1786)
- Pilestræde 39 (1784–1786)
- Pilestræde 41-45 (1784–1786)
- Pilestræde 42 (1784–1786)
- Kronprinsensgade 2 / Købmagergade 34 (1785)
- Kronprinsensgade 4-6 (1785–1791)
- Kronprinsensgade 11 (1785)
- Købmagergade 32 (1785)
