= Johanne Rosing =

Danish stage actress and ballet dancer

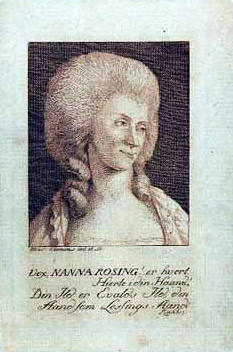
- Johanne Cathrine Rosing. Etching by Johan Frederik Clemens.
- Born: Johanne Caroline Rosing; 2 June 1756; Copenhagen, Denmark
- Died: 15 January 1853 (aged 96); Frederiksberg, Denmark
- Occupation: Actress
- Years active: 1773–1823
- Spouse: Michael Rosing (m. 1778)
- Children: Emilie Rosing

Johanne Cathrine Rosing (née Olsen; 2 June 1756 – 15 January 1853) was a Danish stage actress and ballet dancer, one of the most noted of the era.

== Biography ==
Born in a poor home as the daughter of Herman Olsen and Gundel Marie Abelgreen. She was a maid before she became a student of the French Ballet company at the court theatre and, in 1772, of the Royal Danish Ballet, when the court theatre became a part of the Royal Danish Theatre. There, she was made an actress in 1773 and given an education of a singer by the theatre. She never learned to read and write. In 1777–1779, she was a member of the academy Det Dramatiske Selskab under the direction of Frederik Schwarz (1753–1838).

She was married the Norwegian actor Michael Rosing (1756–1818). They were the parents of singer and stage actress Emilie Rosing (1783–1811).

As an actress, she had her great breakthrough in the 1780s, when she began to play the part of mother: in the part of a "tender mother", she personified the new ideal of femininity of the time, which was highlighted by the fact that she was often pregnant on stage. In these roles, she gained great popularity. She retired in 1823.

She died on 15 January 1853 and is buried in Asminderød Cemetery in Fredensborg.
