= Emilie Rosing =

Danish singer and stage actress

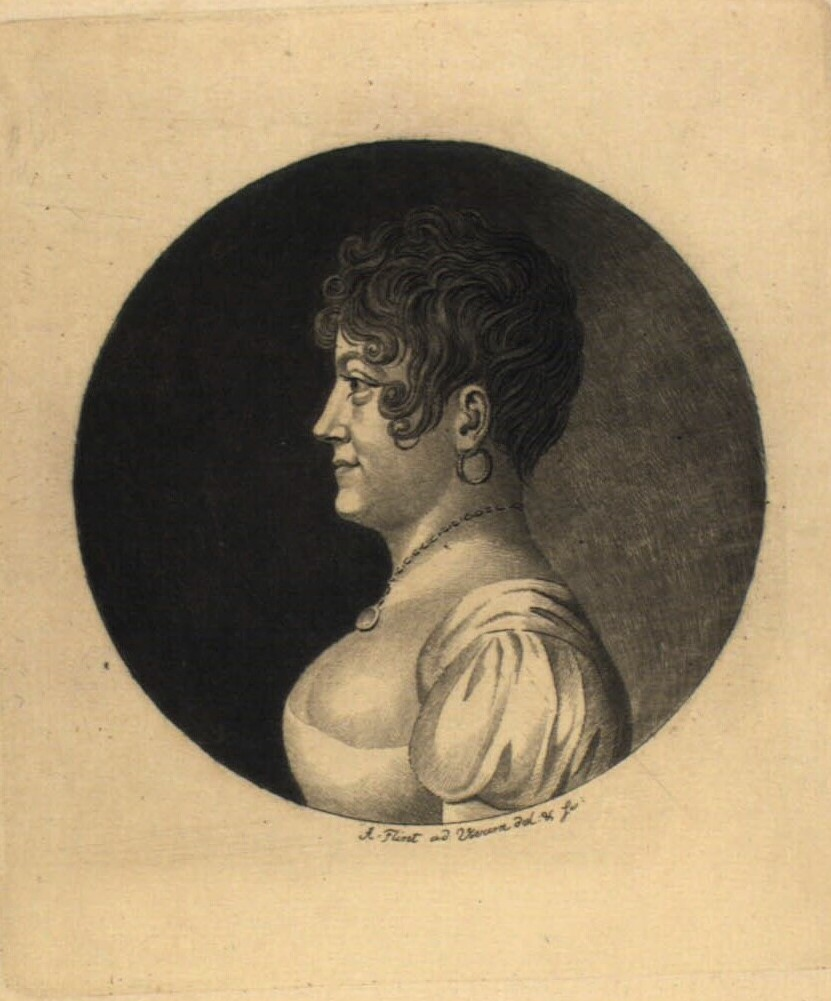
- Portrait of Emilie Rosing by Anders Ole Flint,
- Born: 6 March 1783; Copenhagen, Denmark
- Died: 23 December 1811 (aged 28); Copenhagen, Denmark
- Resting place: Assistens Cemetery
- Occupation: Actress
- Years active: 1802-1811
- Parents: Michae Rosingl (father); Johanne Rosing (mother)

Emilie Wilhelmine Rosing (6 March 1783 – 23 December 1811) was a Danish singer and stage actress. She was perhaps the most famous female stage artist in Denmark during the age of Napoleon.

== Biography ==
Rosing was the daughter of the well known acting couple Michael and Johanne Rosing. Rosing was active at the Royal Danish Theatre in Copenhagen between 1802 and 1811, and described as a personification of the new neo-Classical ideal of the time. Formally employed as a chorist, she achieved such great success as an actor that she was given one leading role after another from the beginning of her debut. She was a controversial artist with her androgynous appearance, and often played boys' breeches roles. Her intelligence and original way of interpreting the often shallow roles she was given was highly debated. She remained a chorist in name, which was frustrating for her, and in 1811, she suffered a complete breakdown. The cause of death is given as cramps.
