= Pilestræde 41–45 =

Listed building complex in Copenhagen

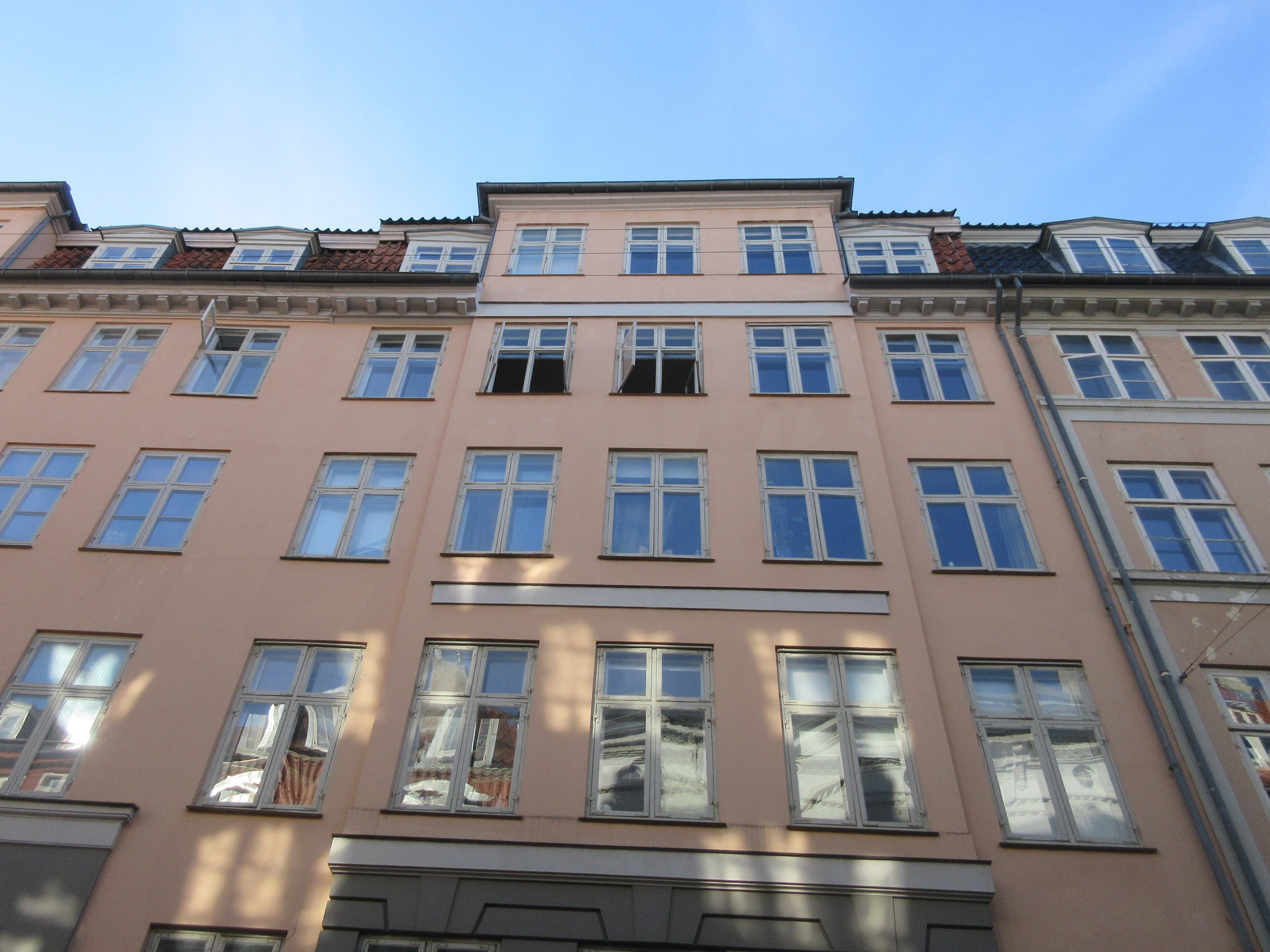
- Detail of the facade of NPilestræde 43.
- Interactive map of the Pilestræde 41–45 area

General information
- Architectural style: Neoclassical
- Location: Copenhagen, Denmark
- Coordinates: 55°40′52″N 12°34′45″E
- Completed: 1784-1786

Design and construction
- Architect: Johan Peter Boye Junge

Pilestræde 41–45 is a late 18th-century building complex in the Old Town of Copenhagen, Denmark, constructed by master mason Johan Peter Boye Junge in 1784–1786, Junge was also responsible for the construction of the adjacent buildings at Pilestræde 37–39 as well as a number of buildings around the corner in Kronprinsensgade. The three buildings were merged into a single property in 1935 and 1962. Two detached warehouses in the courtyards on the rear are also part of the property. The entire building complex was listed in the Danish registry of protected buildings and places in 1945. Johan Peter Boye Junge was himself a resident of Pilestræde 45 from 1798 to 1805. Other notable former residents include the Swedish military officer Curry Gabriel Treffenberg, clergyman and church historian Ludvig Helveg and ballet master at the Royal Danish Ballet August Bournonville.

== History ==
=== Site history, 1689-1783 ===
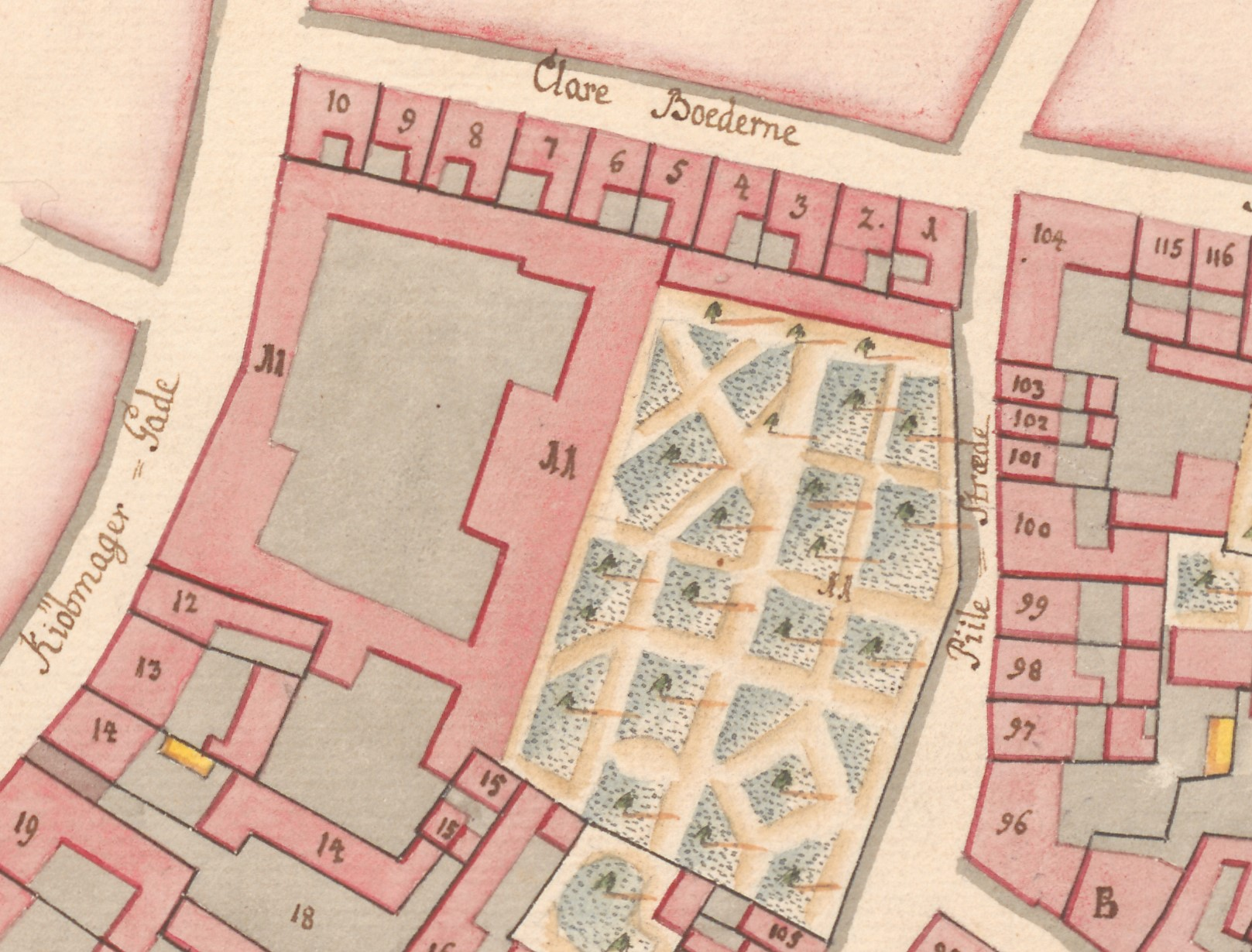
No. 11 seen on a detail from Christian Gedde's map of Købmager Quarter, 1757.

The site was formerly part of a much larger property, listed in Copenhagen's first cadastre of 1689 as No. 14 in Købmager Quarter. On 24 July 1672, it was sold at auction to storkansler Conrad von Reventlow (1644–1708). The property was after his death in 1708 passed to his son Christian Detlev Reventlow (1671–1738). The buildings were destroyed in the Copenhagen Fire of 1728 but subsequently rebuilt. Christian Ditlev Reventlow owned the property until his death. It was after his death passed to his son Christian Ditlev Reventlow.

The property was listed in the new cadastre of 1756 as No. 11 in Købmager Quarter. It was referred to as Reventlow's Hotel at that time. A large four-winged building complex surrounding a central courtyard occupied the half of the property that faced the more prominent street Købmagergade. The half of the property that faced the quieter street Pilestræde was the site of a large garden complex. A row of small properties separated the property from Klareboderne in the northwest.

=== Boye Junge and the new building ===
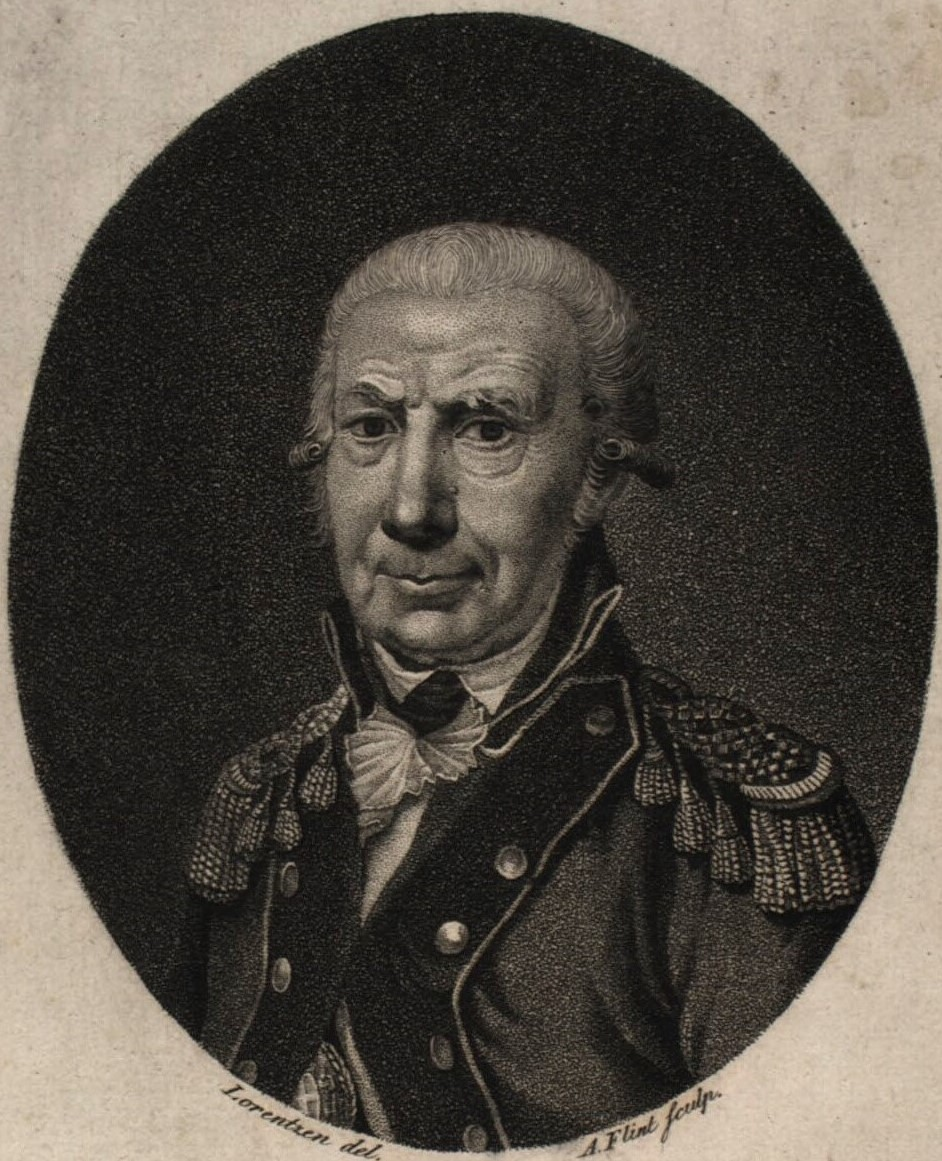
Johan Peter Boye Junge

The property was acquired by the master carpenter Johan Peter Boye Junge (1735-1807) in 1783 and he was shortly thereafter granted royal permission to establish the new street Kronprinsensgade on the land. Boye Junge was one of the largest private employers in Copenhagen of his time.

Boye Junge started the construction of the three buildings at what is now Pilestræde 41–45 in 1894. Pilestræde 34 was completed in 1785. The two other buildings were completed in 1786. Boye Junge was also responsible for constructing Pilestræde 37–39, Kronprinsensgade 4-6 and 11, Kronprinsensgade 2/ Købmagergade 34 and Købmagergade 32. He resided in one of the apartments at Pilestræde 45 (No. 11A) from 1798 to 1805. He had prior to that resided in the corner building Pilestræde 37 since its completion in 1786. In 1787, he was appointed as chief of the Copenhagen Fire Brigade.

The three buildings now known as Pilestræde 41–45 were individually listed in the new cadastre of 1806 as No. 80–82. No. 80 (now Pilestræde 45) was still owned by Boye June at that time. No. 81 (now Pilestræde 43) belonged to Philip von Essen. No. 82 belonged to Christen Dyhr.

=== 1845 census ===
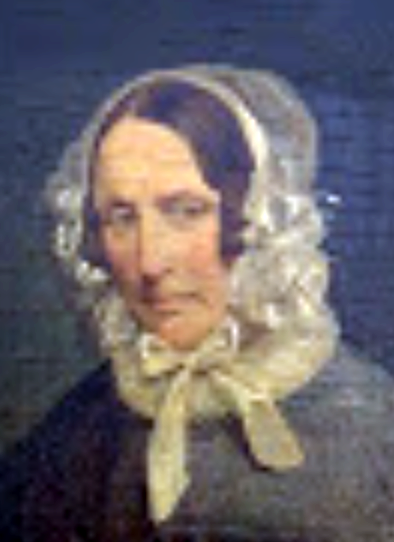
Anna Sophie Kirksteen

No. 80 was home to a total of 22 residents at the time of the 1845 census. Johann Heitlas (1788-1862), a teacher at the Catholic School, resided on the first floor with his wife Sophie (née Brahde), their 13-year-old daughter Josephine Heitlas, one maid and the lodger Carl *von Gualen. Berendt Amvel Meyer, an art dealer, resided on the second floor with his wife Rachel Meyer /née Delhoner), their two daughters, his sister-in-law Bella Delhoner and one maid. Ferdinand Bergmann, a merchant trading on Iceland, resided on the third floor with his wife Emilie Charlotte Bergmann, their two sons (aged four and six), his mother-in-law Else Kristine Hillebrandt (née Schov) and one maid. Anna Sophie Schack (née Kirkstein, 1788–1854), widow of lawyer Gregers Schack (1781-1840), resided on the fourth floor with three of her children (aged 14 to 32) and one maid. The daughter Marie Caroline (1820-1899) would later marry the industrialist Lauritz Peter Holmblad.

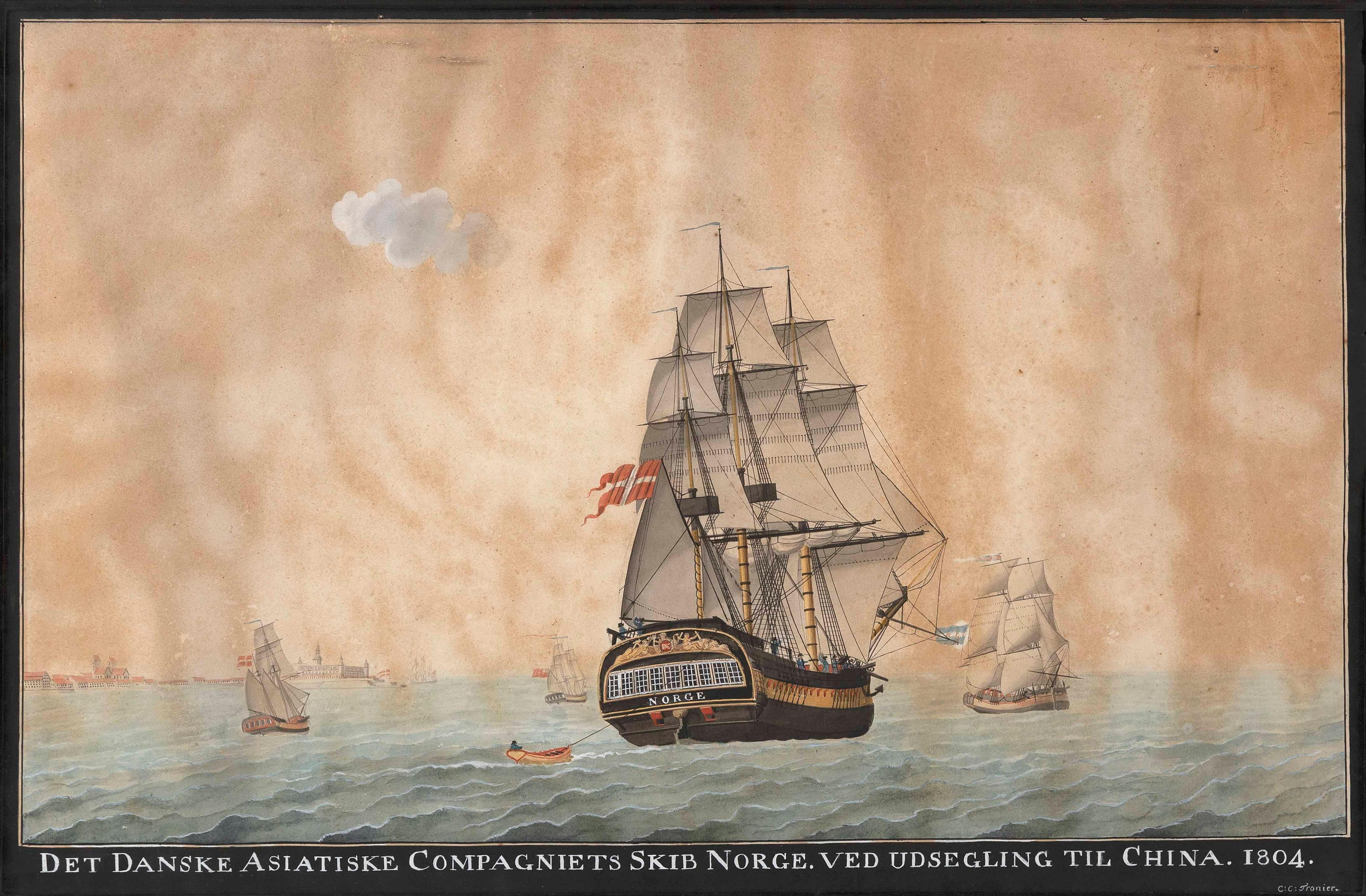
Christian Carl Tronier: The Danish Asiatic Company's ship Norge, bound for China, 1804.

No. 81 was home to 33 residents in six households at the 1845 census. Carl Christian Tronier, a retired sea captain who had sailed on China, for instance with the Danish Asiatic Company's chinamen Kongens af Danmark and Frederik den Sjette, resided on the first floor with his brother Wulf Veit Christoph Tronier (colonel, widower), four of the brother's dchildren (aged 26 to 36) and one maid. Sara Salomonsen (née Philipm 1797–1852), widow of a hosier (hosekræmmer) Abraham David Salomonsen (1750-1838), resided on the second floor with her five children (aged 17 to 28) and one maid. Terenti Ossenin, a cantor at the Russian legation, resided on the third floor with his wife Margaretha Ossinin, their four children (aged four to 12) and one maid. Sophie Møller, a widow in her 60s, was also residing on the third floor with her daughter Barine Møller. Eduard Holmblad (1802-1881, son of Lauritz Peter Holmblad), an undertaker, resided on the fourth floor with his wife Adlaide Juliette Antoinette Holmblad, their five children (aged one to 16) and a wet nurse. Anne Henriette Krog, an unmarried woman who kept cattle, probably in a building in the courtyard, resided on the ground floor with one maid.

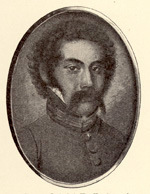
Curry Gabriel Treffenberg

No. 82 was home to a total of 21 residents at the 1845 census. Carl Brunskou, a turner, resided on the ground floor with three apprentices (aged 17 to 20). Joseph Philip Hartvig, a textile merchant (soæle- og klædehandler), resided on the first floor with his wife Gitte Hartvig and one maid. Curry Gabriel Treffenberg, a Swedish military officer who had moved to Copenhagen in 1821, resided on the second floor with his wife Juliane Frederikke Charlotte Louise Andrea Treffenberg, their five-year-old daughter Nicoline Olivia Louise Amalie Treffenberg and one maid. Anna Chatrina Hein, widow of a lieutenant colonel, resided on the third floor with four of her children (aged 20 to 31), one maid and one lodger. Hans Jørgen Hagerup Berthig, an army major on paid leave (ventepenge), resided on the fourth floor with his wife Christiane Frederike Louise Berthig and one maid.

=== Later history ===
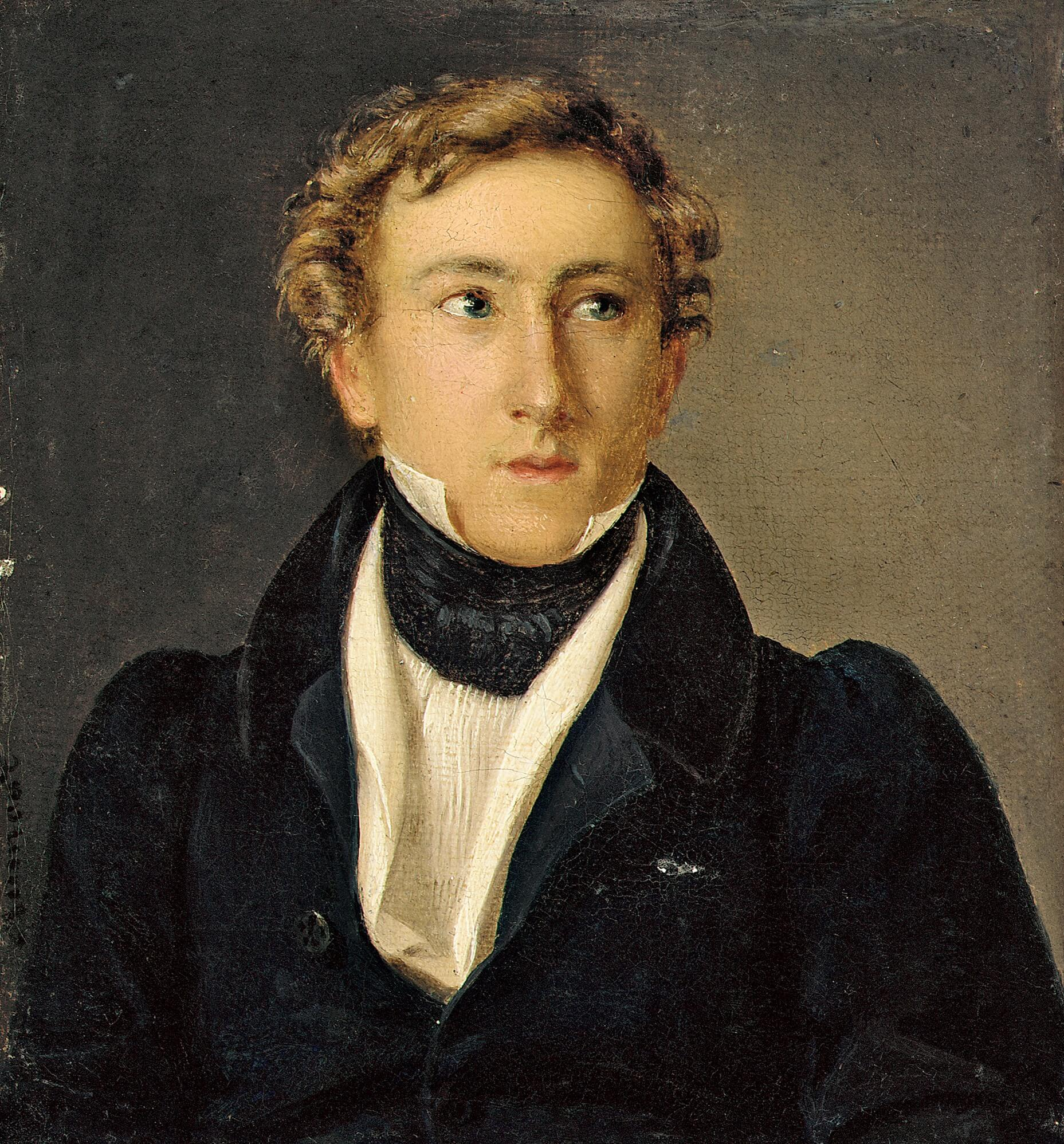
August Bournonville

Ludvig Helveg (1818-1883), a clergyman and church historian, resided in one of the apartments at No. 81 (Pilestræde 43) from 1851 to 1953. August Bournonville (1805-1879), ballet master at rgw Eoyal Danish Ballet, resided at No. 80 (Piletræde 45) from 1858 to 18588. His next home was at Nørregade 31-33.

The three buildings were listed Pilestræde 41 (No. 82), Pilestræde 43 (No. 81) and Pilestræde 45 (No. 80>) when house numbering was introduced as a supplant to the old cadastral numbers by quarter in 1859.

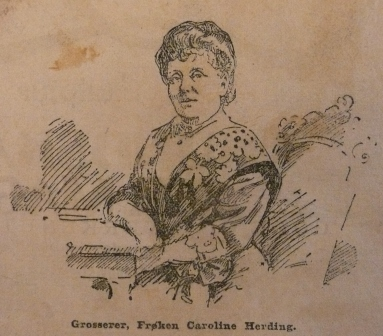
Caroline Herding.

Caroline Hansen (1854 - 1940m from 1902 Caroline Herding) opened a shop at Pilestræde 43 in 1887. Her shop, C.M. Hansen & Co.m was especially known for matches and Christmas decorations. Om 1888, she was licensed as a wholesale merchant (grosserer) as the second woman in Denmark (after Wilhelmine Rerup. In 1890, she founded Københavns Bestillingskontor for Tændstikker samt økonomiske Husholdningsartikler. She was also active in the Danish Women's Society, Danish Women's Council and in the management of the Women's Building. In 1904, she was able to buy the property at Pilestræde 50 on the other side of the street. She subsequently moved her home and business to this building.

A gilder's business, L. Noch, Lundquist og Olsen's Eftf., was for many years based in the building. The firm was the result of a merger on 1 March 1911, between L. Noch (founded by A. Jensen and C. F. L. Noch and later continued by the latter's widow K. S. M. Noch) and Lundquist & Olsen. One of the two companies was possibly already based in the building prior to the merger. The firm was from 1944 owned by Aage W. Nielsen (1893-) and operated under the name L. Noch, Lundquist og Olsen's Eftf. (L. Noch, Lundquist og Olsen's Successor). It was based at Pilestræde 41 until at least 1950. E. Wandler's Efterfølger, a manufacturer of military and civilian scarfs, was based at Pilestræde 1910 in 1910.

In 1895, No. 81 (Pilestræde 43) was merged with No. 80 (Pilestræde 45), In 1962, No. 82 /Pilestræde 41) was also merged with No. 80.

== Architecture ==
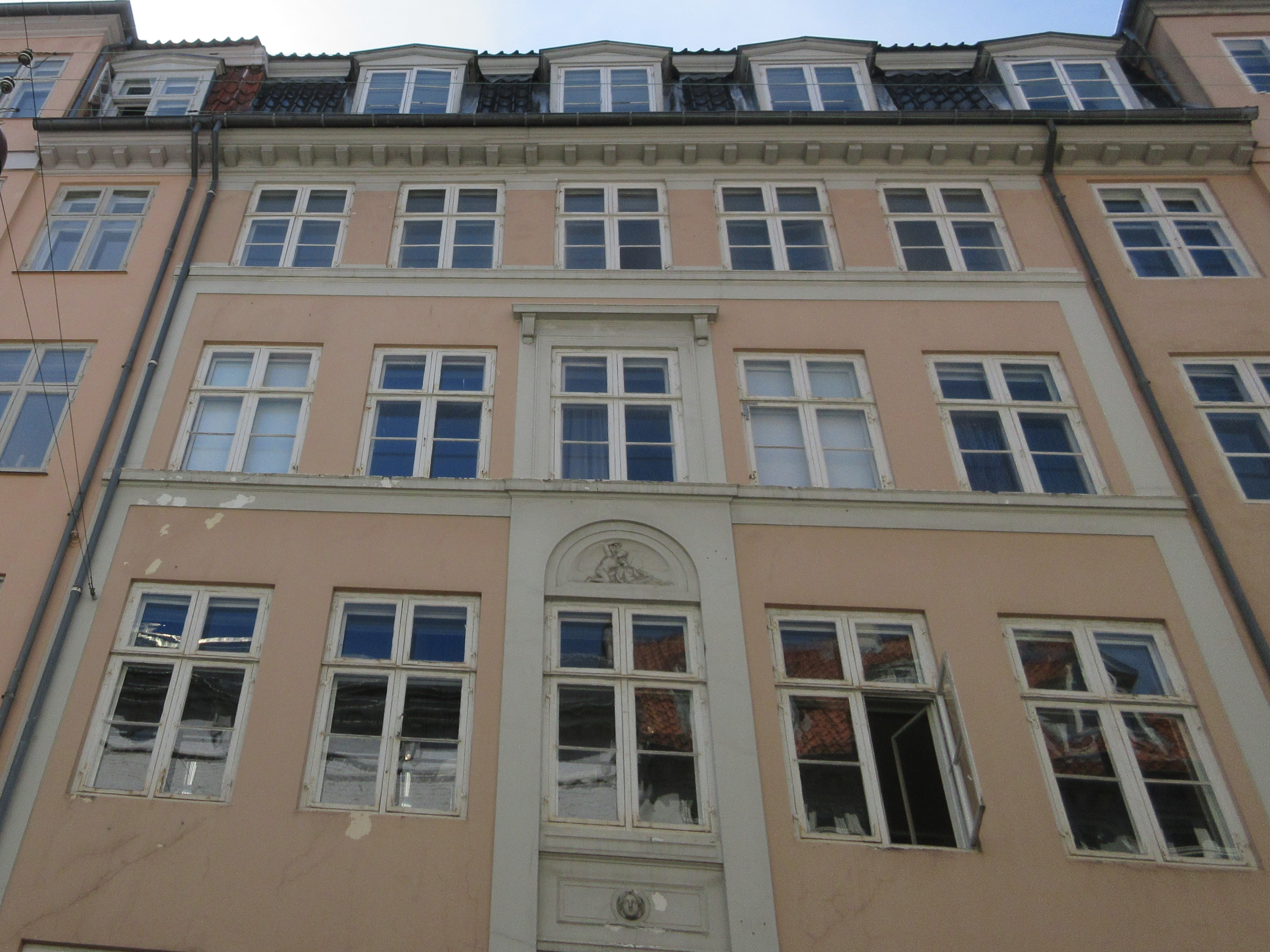
Pilestræde 41 in 2022..

The three individual buildings are all five storeys tall and five bays wide. The interior of the three buildings is now completely integrated. Their plastered and grey-painted facades leave a homogenous impression, together with those of the adjacent buildings at Pilestræde 37–39, although details of their facades vary.

The ground floor of Pilestræde 41 is finished with shadow joints and black-painted. Above the ground floor is a band of black-painted sandstone. The upper part of the facade is finished with lateral lesenes, sill courses below the windows of the third and fourth floor and a modillion cornice. The slightly projecting central bay on the first to third floor is tipped by a hood mould supported by corbels above the third-floor window and features a plaster relief in an arched niche above the second-floor window and a mascaron above first-floor one. The Mansard roof is clad in black tile on its steep part and in red tile on its upper part. A three-bay side wing extends from the rear side of the building.

The facade of Pilestræde features a three-bay median risalit. The median risalit is on the first floor finished with shadow joints. The main entrance in the bay furthest to the right is topped by a hood mould supported by corbels. Another door in the bay furthest to the left provides access to the shop in the ground floor of Pilestræde 41. An eight-bays-long side wing extends from the rear side of the building. It has a monopitched roof clad in red tiles. The building shares a small courtyard with Pilestræde 43. A free-standing two-storey building with a flat roof is located in the courtyard. All the facades that face the yard are painted yellow.

The facade of Pilestræde is finished by a modillioned cornice. An eight-bays-long side wing extends from the rear side of the building. A two-storey former warehouse is located in the courtyard. It is attached to Kronprinsensgade 7 in one end to Klareboderne 16 in the other.

The three integrated buildings front the street and the two detached rear wings were all listed in the Danish registry of protected buildings and places in 1945.

== Today ==
The building complex is owned by Jesper Abel and N. Skovgård Larsen. Some of the apartments in Pilestræde 43 and Pilestræde 45 have been merged. The principal staircase of Pilestræde is in addition to this now also used for access to the apartments in Pilestræde 41. Temains of the principal staircase in Pilestræde 41 are now instead used as an internal staircase in some of the apartments in that building. A Norse Projects flagship store is located at Pilestræde 41. The entrance is located in the bay furthest to the left at No. 43.

== Gallery ==
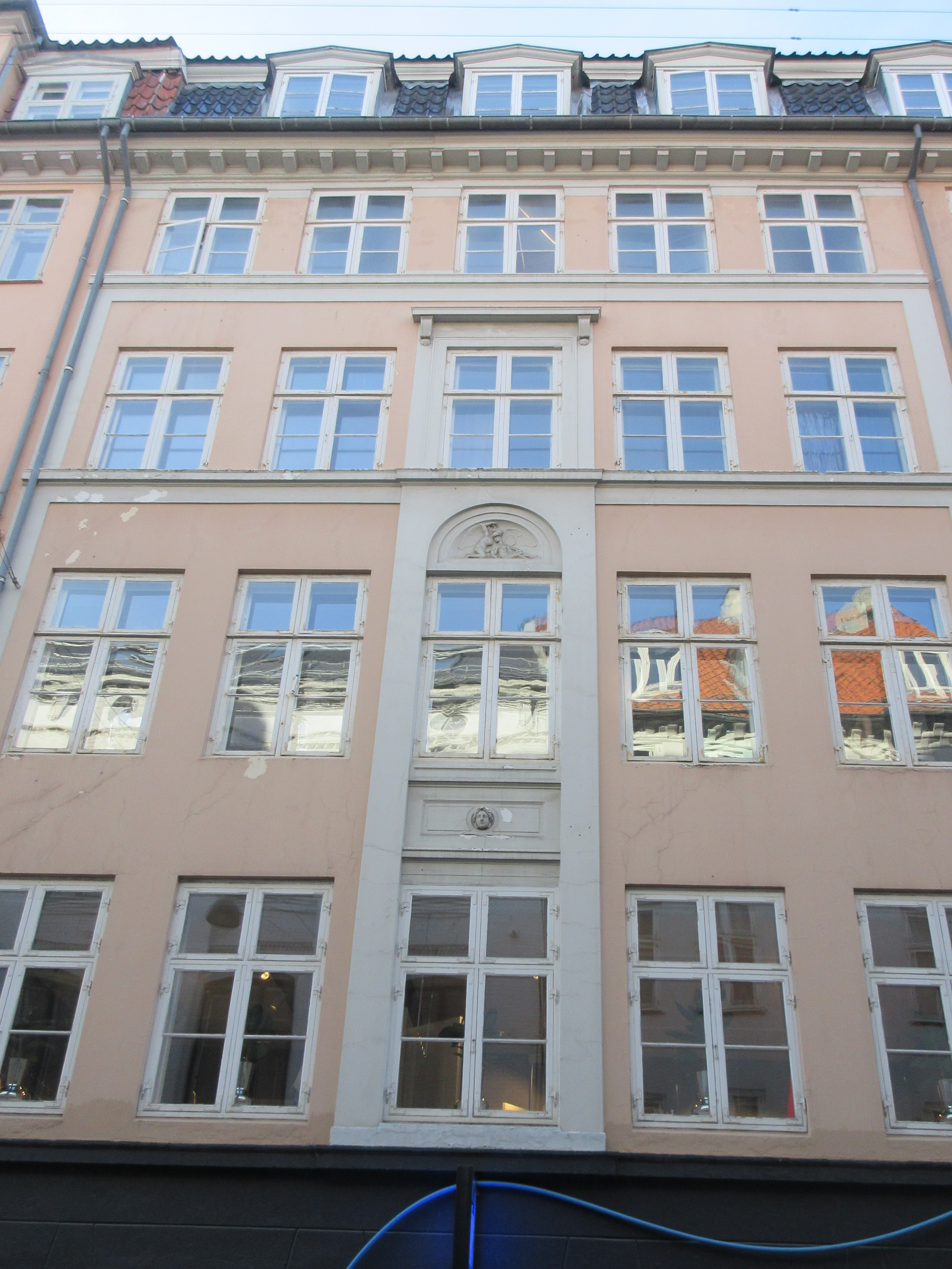
Pilestræde 41

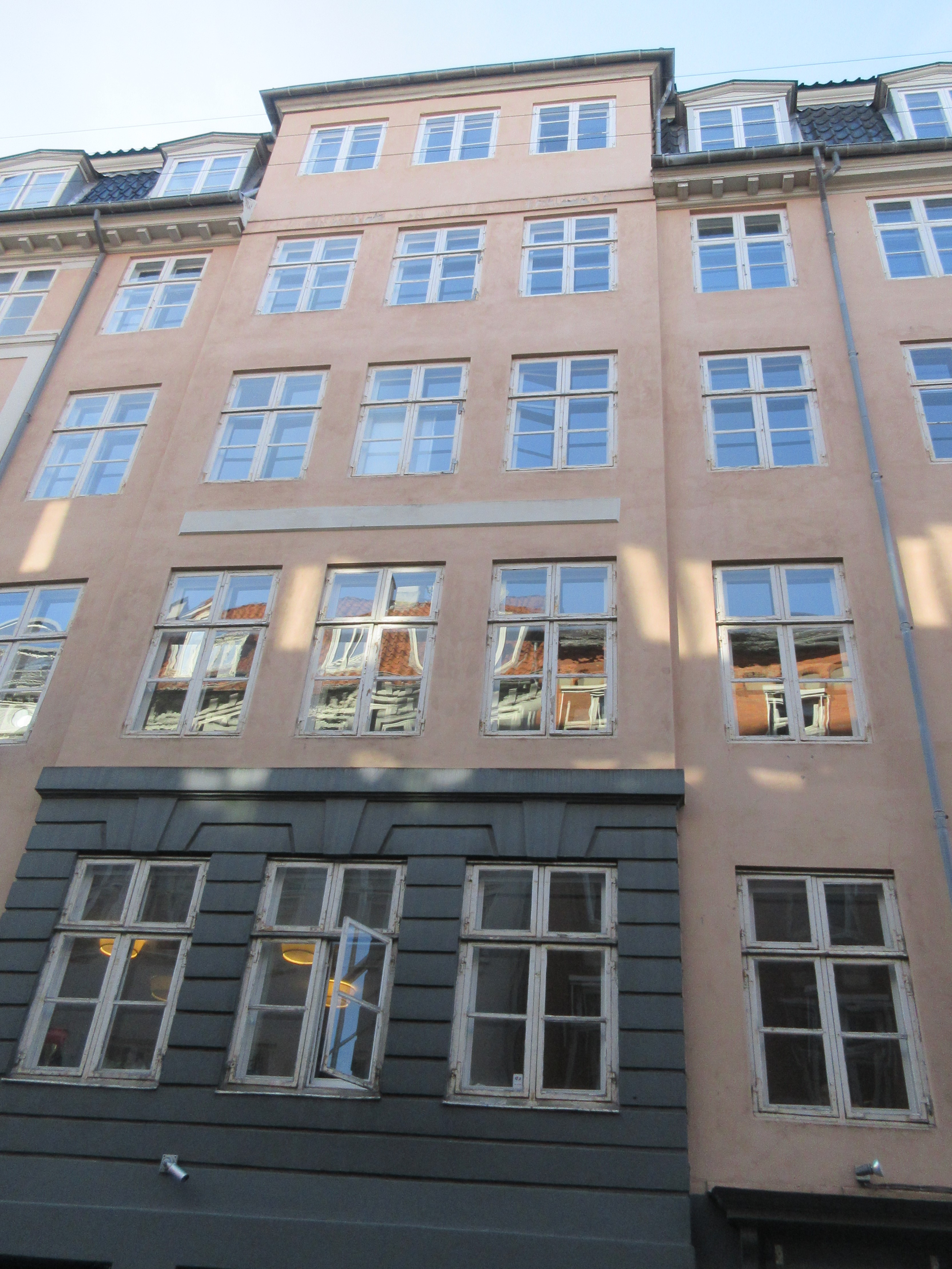
Pilestræde 43

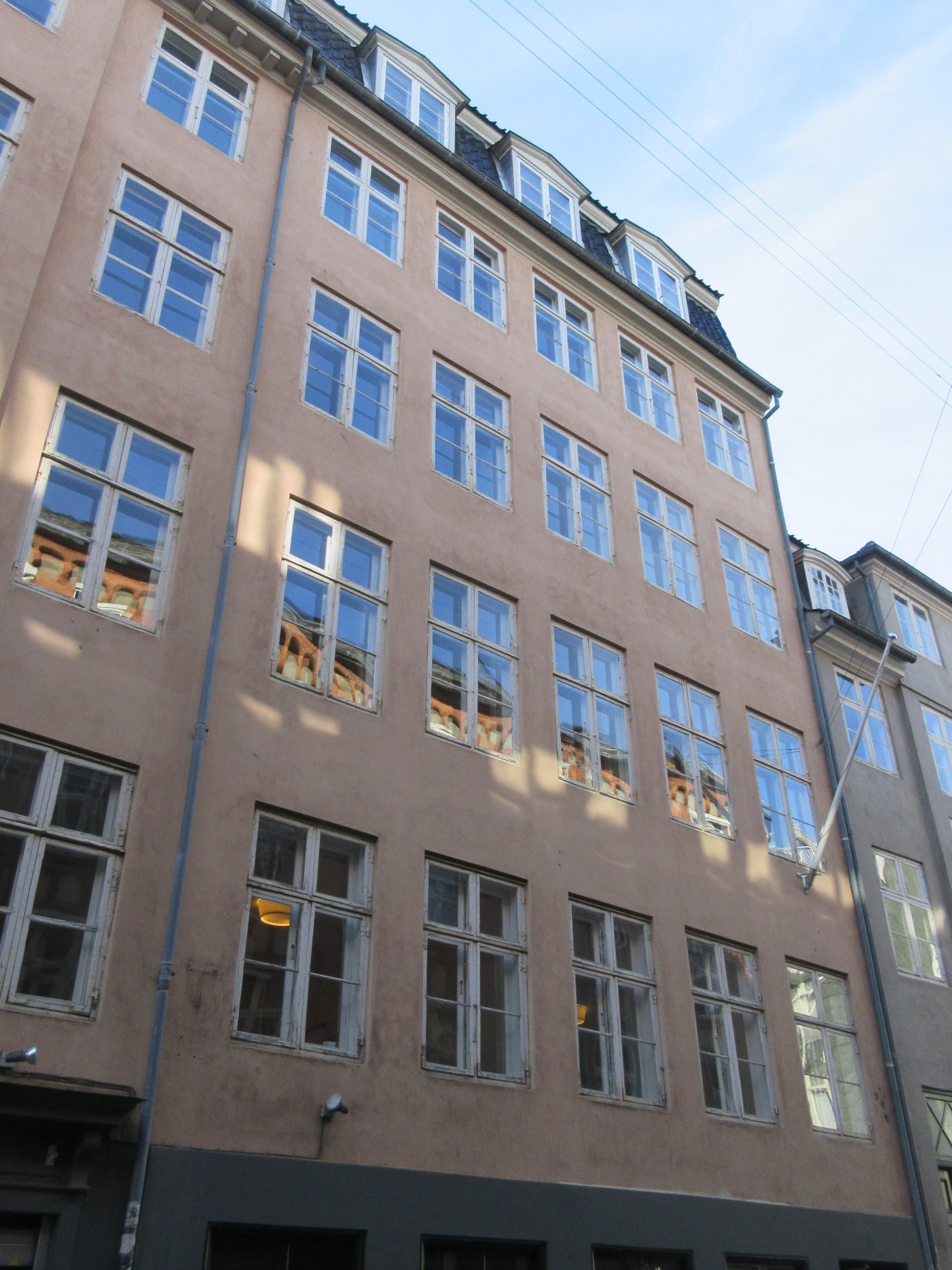
Pilestræde 45.
