= Frederik Schwarz =

Danish actor

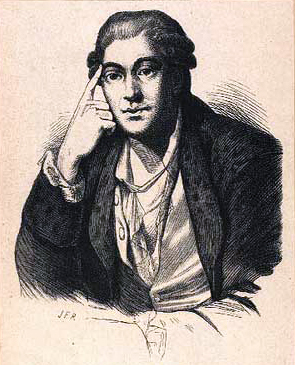
Frederik Schwarz.

Frederik Schwarz (1753-1838) was a Danish actor. He was an elite actor of the Royal Danish Theatre from 1773 to 1810. He played roles in both comedy and tragedy and had a great impact on the contemporary acting tradition in Denmark when forming the new organisation of the theater, as the founder and manager of the Det Dramatiske Selskab from 1775 to 1778 and as the theater's acting instructor from 1779 to 1816.
