= Andreas Flinch =

Danish goldsmith and woodengraver (1813 - 1872)

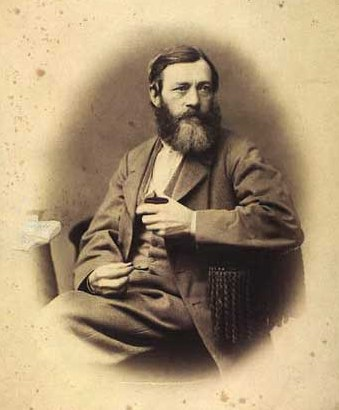
Portrait of Flinch, kept in the Royal Danish Library

Andreas Christian Ferdinand Flinch (3 February 1813 – 16 August 1872), a wood-engraver, was born at Copenhagen in 1813, and studied at the Academy there from 1832 to 1838. He had previously worked as a goldsmith, but he afterwards took to wood-engraving from self-tuition, and introduced a special method of his own into Denmark, consisting in drawing the outline upon the block and working out the details with a free hand. In 1840, he settled down as a lithographer, and published the popular Flinchs Almanak with woodcut illustrations. He died at Copenhagen in 1872.
