= Karoline Rosing =

Greenlandic midwife and translator (c. 1842–1901)

- Born: c. 1842; Paamiut
- Died: 1901 (aged 58–59); Kangaamiut
- Occupations: Midwife and translator

Karoline Rosing (c. 1842-1901) was a 19th-century Greenlandic midwife and early translator into the Greenlandic language.

The daughter of a sealer, Rosing learned Danish and travelled to Copenhagen to study to become a midwife. After passing her examinations in 1867, she became the first Greenlandic midwife to complete their education at the Danish Royal Laying-In Hospital. Beginning in 1882, she and her family were stationed in Kangaamiut by the Royal Greenland Trading Department, where Rosing was the only trained medical professional. Rosing was the first Greenlandic woman to publish an independent work of translation, in 1886. She worked as a translator for the Greenlandic newspaper Atuagagdliutit and also translated stories into Greenlandic.

Rosing was married to a Dane, Peter Frederik Rosing, and had nine children.
