= Det Dramatiske Selskab (Denmark) =

Det Dramatiske Selskab was a Danish acting academy active in Copenhagen in Denmark in 1777-1779. It was a pioneer institution as the first of its kind in the Nordic countries and had great impact on the acting profession during its short tenure, and enjoyed much respect. It was the predecessor of the first organized acting school at the Royal Danish Theatre, which succeeded it when it was dissolved after but two years, and thus played an important pioneer role.

== History ==
The academy was founded by the actor Frederik Schwarz, director Niels Hansen, actor Jacob Arends and Michael Rosing (actor), with Schwarz as the chairperson of the academy. At this point, the Royal Danish Theatre did not yet have an organized school, and the actors was instructed by lessons from seniors. After a study trip to Paris in 1775, Schwarz saw a need for an organized learning of acting, and started to give lessons in what he had learned in Paris. He saw a need for more organized teaching, and therefore founded the academy. It was given a room used for singing lessons by Royal Danish Theatre to meet.

The members was composed of actors from the Royal Danish Theatre. The majority of the younger actors from the royal stage came to be members. The members of the academy provided each other with constructive criticism of their performances in a time when there where no organized official critic of the stage performances in Denmark, in an effort to raise the quality of acting. The academy also acted as a testing stage for new plays, and criticized the outdated way of costume used on the royal theater and opted for a reform. In March 1778, the academy stage the play Balders Død in Hoftheatret, which was described as a success.

Det Dramatiske Selskab was successful and achieved reform in costume and repertoire on the Danish national stage. In 1779, the academy was dissolved because of inner conflicts, but replaced by a proper organized acting school at the Royal Danish Theatre, where Frederik Schwarz was made instructor.
