= Michael Rosing =

Norwegian-Danish actor

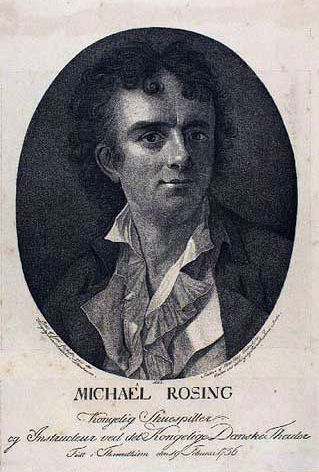
Michael Rosing.

Michael Rosing (19 February 1756 – 12 October 1818) was a Norwegian-Danish actor.

== Early life ==
Rosing was born in Røros, Norway. In 1775 he graduated from the University of Copenhagen.

== Career ==
In 1776 he joined the Royal Danish Theatre. He was an elite actor of the Royal Theatre from 1777 to 1808. He was most known for his roles in tragedy, lover roles and Nordic hero roles. He was a member of the Det Dramatiske Selskab, and an instructor of the royal acting school in 1788–1808, and its principal from 1804.

== Personal life ==
He was married to Johanne Rosing. The couple had 17 children. One of the daughters was the actress Emilie Rosing. The eldest daughter Johanne Ophelia Rosing (1778-1929) was married to the wealthy paper manufac turer Johan Christian Drewsen. A third daughter, Antoinette Louise Rosing (1791-1874) was married to the portrait painter Carl Wilhelm Wiehe. A fourth daughter, Golla Hermandina Rosing, was the mother of concert pianist Golla Hammerich.
