= David Halberstadt =

Jewish Danish businessman

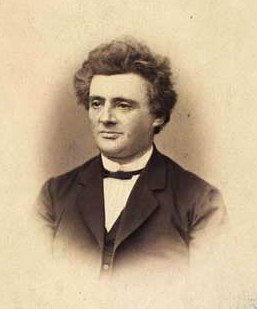
- Halberstadt
- Born: 12 July 1819; Copenhagen, Denmark
- Died: 14 July 1874 (aged 103); Copenhagen, Denmark
- Occupation: Businessman

David Moses Halberstadt (12 July 1819 – 14 June 1874) was a Jewish Danish businessman. His firm David Halberstadt (founded 1834) established a steam mill in Christianshavn in Copenhagen in 1857 and later developed into the largest wholesaler of hides, fur, leather and wool in the Nordic countries.

== Early life and education ==
Halberstadt was born on 22 July 1819 in Copenhagen, the son of merchant Moses Gottschalk Halberstadt (1792–1872) and Bolette Bella Davidsen (1790–1863). He attended Borgerdyd School and was then apprenticed to M. Berg in Randers.

== Career ==
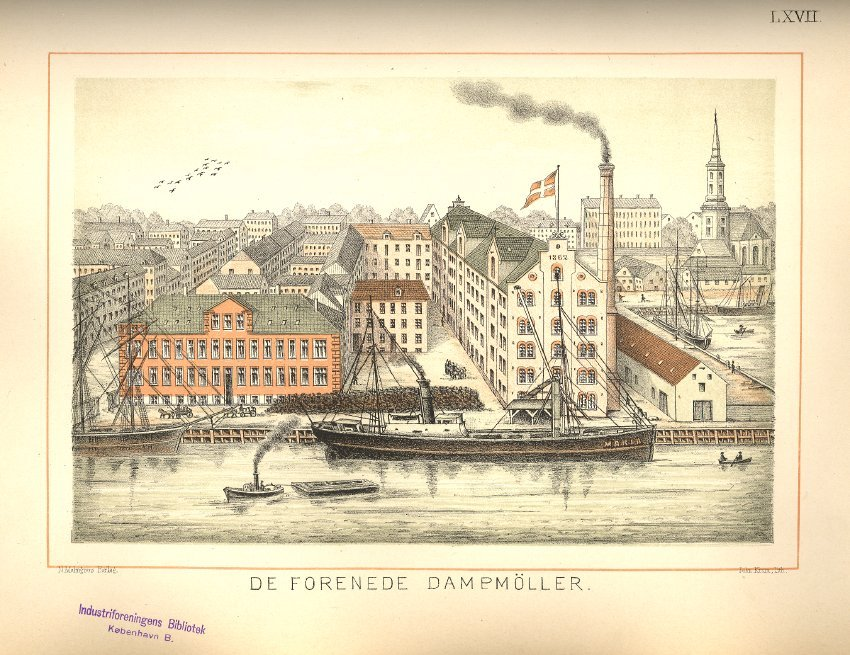
Christianshavn Steam Mill in circa 1888

After completing his apprenticeship, Halberstadt initially worked for Hartvig Philip Rée in Randers before moving to Copenhagen where he was employed by J. Levysohn. He was granted citizenship as a merchant and established his own trading house in 1834. It traded as David Halberstadt & Co. after he went into a partnership with Philip, whom he knew from Randers, just a few months later. The firm started out as a modest grain business but grew rapidly over the course of the next few years and was able to purchase H. Puggaard & Co.'s property in Christianshavn in 1857, where they established a large steam mill. Christianshavn Steam Mill (Lille Torvegade 2) was later owned in a partnership with Isaac Wulff Heyman and Meyer Herman Bing.

The firm had also started trading in hides, fur, leather and wool. These activities grew steadily until it had become the largest firm of its kind in the Nordic countries. A few years prior to Halberstadt's death, the steam mill in Christianshavn was sold to De Forenede Dampmøller.

== Other activities ==
Halberstadt was elected in 1857 to Grosserer-Societetet's committee. He was also a member of the Maritime and Commercial Court from 1872 until his death. He was also a board member of Kjøbenhavns private Laanebank for a while.

== Personal life ==
Halberstadt married Sophie Meyer (5 May 1831 – 23 December 1916) on 4 December 1851. She was the daughter of merchant Abraham Meyer (1795–1865) and Betty v. Halle (1801–1863).

He died on 14 June 1874 and is buried in the Jewish Northern Cemetery in Copenhagen. His widow remarried medical doctor Jean Marie Adolphe Marcet and moved to Toulouse.
