= Herman Trier =

Danish educator and politician (1845–1925)

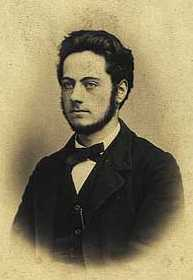
Herman Trier

Herman Trier (10 May 1845 – 1 September 1925) was a Danish educator and politician.

== Early life and education ==
Trier was born on 10 May 1845 in Copenhagen, Denmark, the son of wholesaler Adolph Meyer Trier and Sophie Bing. His father, a son of the merchant Jacob Trier, was a founding partner of Adolph Trier & Goldschmidt. His mother was a daughter of bookseller and educator Herman Jacob Bing and sister of Bing & Grøndahl co-founder Meyer Herman Bing.

Trier received his early education at the Von Westenske Institut. He then went to the University of Copenhagen, studying jurisprudence there for a few years. He began studying pedagogics in 1864.

== Career ==
In 1876, Trier began publishing a series of biographies and character studies of various authors called Kultur-Historiske Personligheder. In that same year, he also wrote his first pedagogic work, Pædagogikken som Videnskab, which endeavored to established pedagogics as an abstract science. In 1879, he began publishing Vor Ungdom, a pedagogic periodical, with School-Inspector P. Voss of Christiania. He also published Pædagogiske Tids- og Stridsspörgsmaal from 1892 to 1893, and in 1901 he wrote on the medieval history of Copenhagen in a text called Gaarden No. 8 Amagertorv.

Trier helped introduce manual training to Denmark's schools. He founded the Danish movement for the education of workmen in 1882 and served as its head from 1883 to 1893. He was president of the Danish liberal students' association from 1884 to 1889. He was also active in the prohibition movement in Denmark. He was first elected a member of the Danish Chamber of Deputies in 1884, and he held his seat with interruptions until 1909. He became its vice-president in 1895, and in 1901 he became its president. In 1910, he was appointed a member of the Danish Upper House. He served on the Copenhagen City Council from 1893 to 1917, serving as its chairman from 1898 to 1907. He was originally a member of the Liberal Party, although he had an independent position and later joined the Radical Left. He led negotiations on solving the State Loan Crisis of 1919.

== Personal life ==
Trier married Anna Henriette Johanne Holm in 1875. She died in 1888. He then married Emma Adler in 1903. She died in 1912. His only son was author Sigurd Trier, whose death in 1920 negatively impacted his health.

Trier died in Copenhagen on 1 September 1925. He was buried in the Mosaisk Vestre Begravelsesplads.
