= Overgaden =

Non-profit contemporary art venue in central Copenhagen, Denmark

O – Overgaden
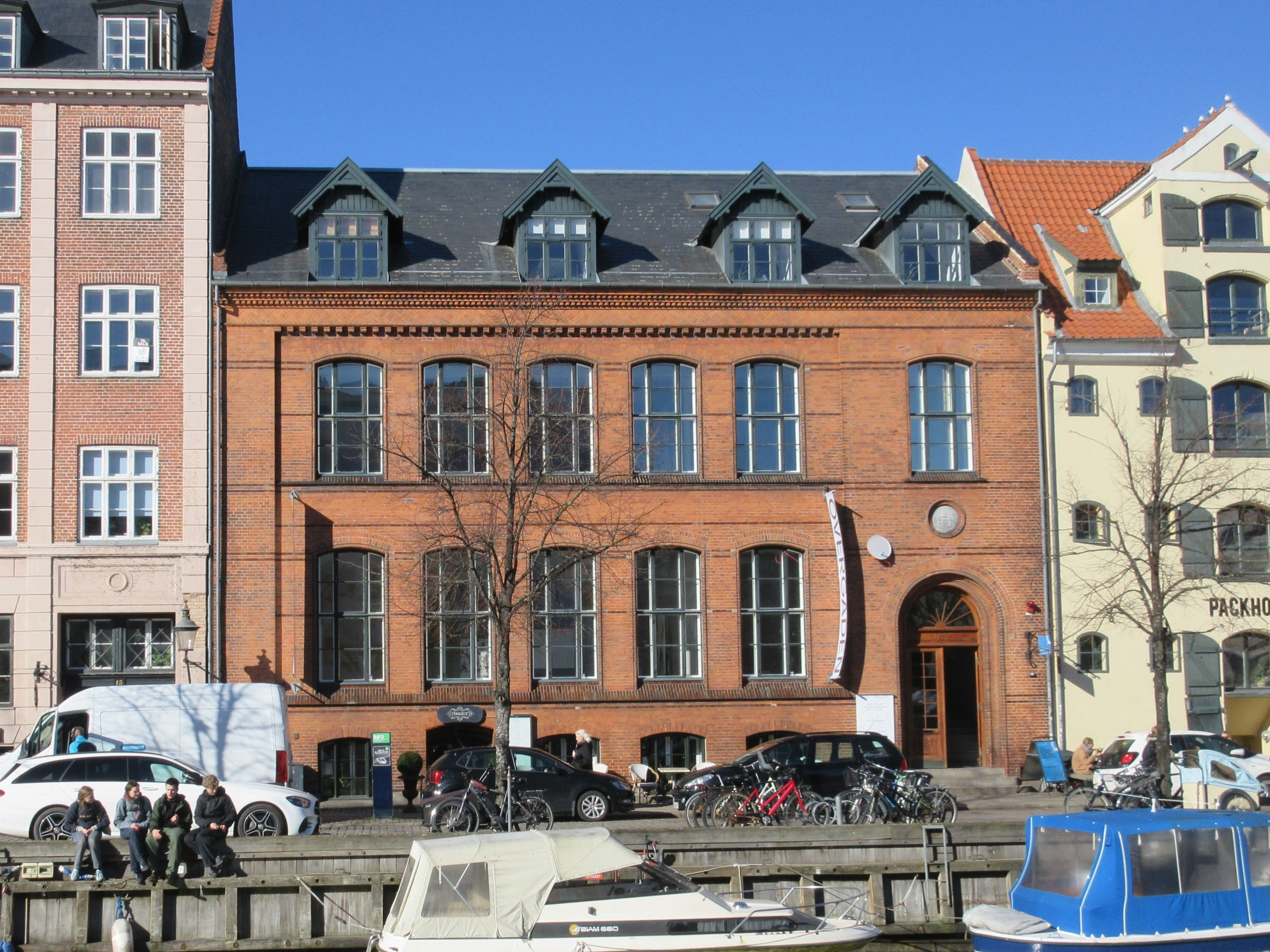
- Interactive map of the O – Overgaden area

General information
- Location: Copenhagen, Denmark
- Coordinates: 55°40′20.75″N 12°35′24.43″E
- Completed: 1858

O – Overgaden, or simply Overgaden, is a non-profit contemporary art venue situated at Overgaden Neden Vandet 17 in the Christianshavn neighbourhood of central Copenhagen, Denmark. It hosts approximately eight major exhibitions each year. Constructed in 1887 to designs by Frederik Bøttger, an architect who also worked for Arbejdernes Byggeforening, Overgaden Neden Vandet 17 was originally built for a charity as a public dining facility. In 1893, it was acquired by C. Ferslew & Co. and converted into a printing workshop under the name Centraltrykkeriet. In 1936, it was expanded with a large funkis-style extension on the rear. The art centre opened in 1986. The building was together with Wildersgade 20 on the other side of the block listed in the Danish registry of protected buildings and places in 1989. The extension from 1936 is not part of the heritage listing.

== History ==
=== 18th century ===
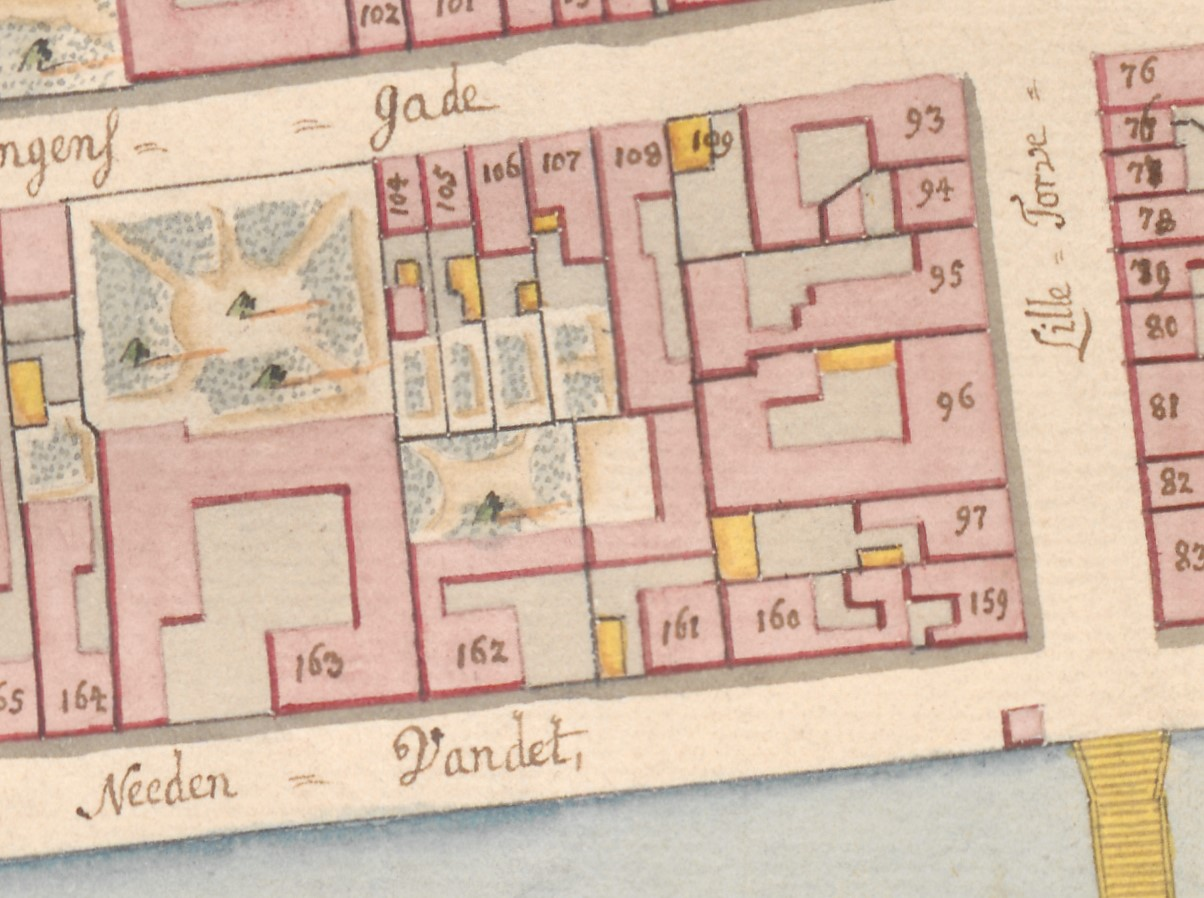
No. 161 seen on a detail from Christian Gedde's map of Christianshavn Quarter, 1757.

Overgaden Neden Vandet 17 and Overgaden Neden Vandet 15 were originally part of the same property. It was owned by distiller and timber merchant Claus Byssing in 1675. The only building on the property was then a building with shed roof pulled back from the street. The rest of the property was used for the storage of timber. Byssing's property was listed as No. 93 in Christianshavn Quarter in Copenhagen's first cadastre of 1689. It was later divided into two separate properties. The property now known as Overgaden Neden Vandet 17 was listed as No. 161 in the new cadastre of 1756. It was at that time owned by ekviopagemester Chrisitan Frederiks Irgens. The other property was listed as No. 162 and belonged to anchor smith Jonas Jochumsen Lund.

The property was owned by skipper Peter Kofoed Anker at the turn of the century. He was related to Marie Kofoed, whose husband, Hans Peter Kofoed, owned the Kofoed House a little further down the canal. Anker had captained some of Kofoed's ships. His property was home to 15 residents in two households at the 1801 census. The owner resided in the building with his wife Elisabeth Christine Bohn, their two-year-old son Hendrich Kofoed Anker, the 49-year-old widow Margrethe Cathrine Ussing, her two daughters and three maids. Peter Petersen Holm, a ship carpenter, resided in the building with his wife Anne Cathrine Meyle, their five-year-old daughter, one maid, one caretaker and one lodger.

The property was listed as No. 164 in the new cadastre of 1806. It was at that time still owned by Peter Koefoed Anker.

The property was home to 16 residents in three households at the 1840 census. Gustav Adoph Muller, a teacher at the Army Cadet Academy, resided in the building with his wife Emilie Lorenza Maria Lorentzen and one maid. Jens Jacob Benedictsen (1806–1842), a merchant trading on Iceland, resided in the building with his wife Anna Marie Frahm, their four children (aged two to seven) and two maids. Andres Petersen and Johanne Charoline Petersen (née Olsen), who were both servants, resided in the building with their three children (aged one to eight). Benedictsen's daughter Maria would later marry EAC-founder H.N. Andersen.

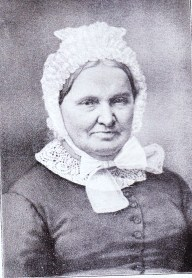
Margarethe Sophie Charlotte Manthey.

The building was home to 20 residents in four households at the 1860 census. Holger Peter Blauten, a clerk, resided on the ground floor with his wife Harriet Barbara (née Cook), their one-year-old twin sons Hans and Wilhelm, their visitor Lizzy Issott, a wet nurse and a maid. Margarethe Sophie Charlotte Wagner (née Manthey, 1811–1887), widow of colonel lieutenant Carl Moritz Frederik August Wagner (1798–1848), resided in the building with her six children (aged 14 to 25). One of the sons was the later military officer Frederik August Hartvig Wagner (1840–1923). Jørgen Christoph Wilstrup, a cand. theol. and public school teacher, resided in the building with his six-year-old daughter Thora Conradine Dagmar Wilstrup, his <omission> Birgitte Christine Wilstrup and one lodger. Niels Adolph Bagger, a workman, resided in the basement with his wife Sophie Frederikke Bagger (née Haag).

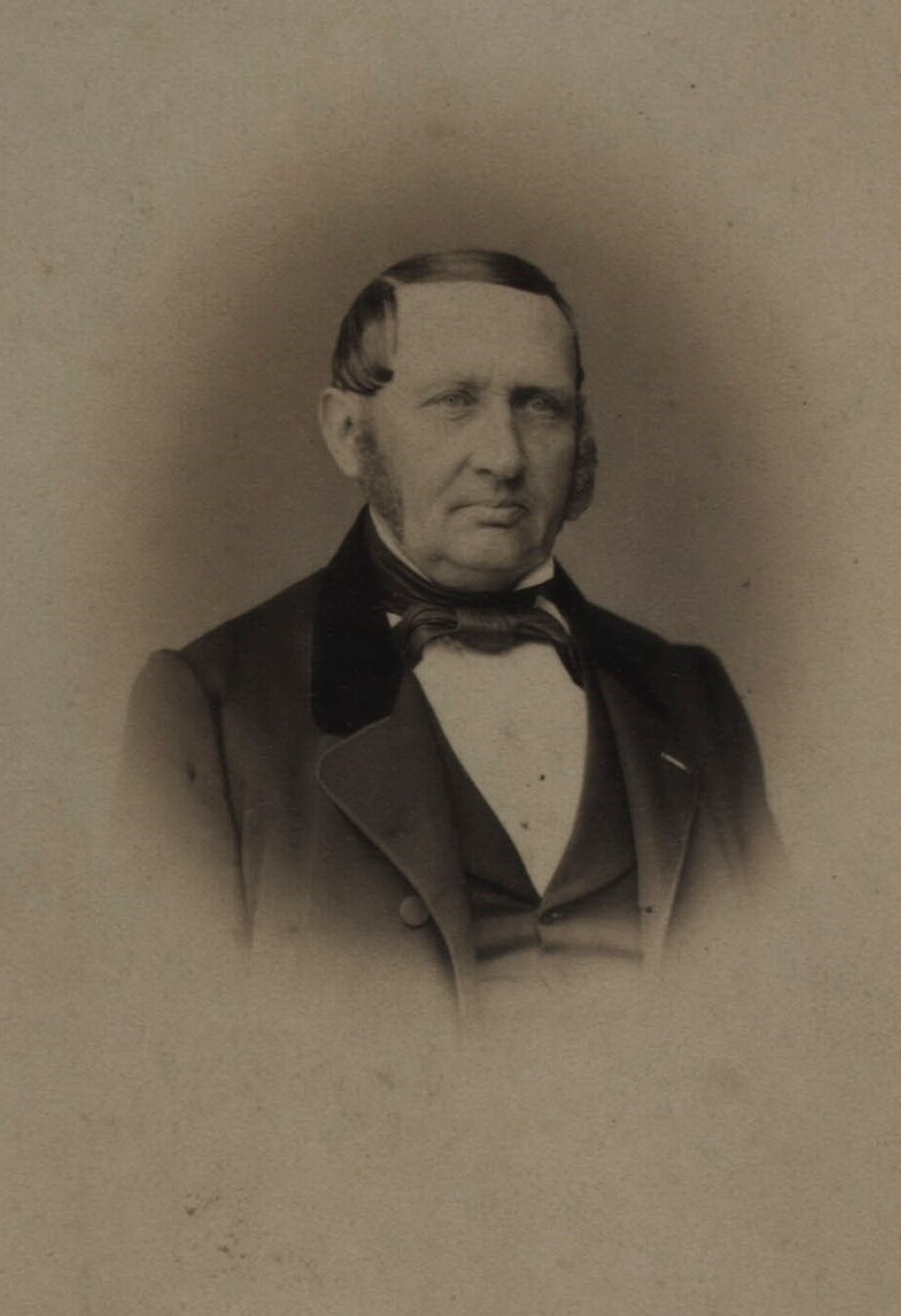
Hans Arreboe Clausen.

The property was home to 14 residents at the 1880 census. Jørgen Lauritz Qvistgaard (1815–1896), a high-ranking civil servant in the Ministry of Naval Affairs with title of overkrigskommissær, resided on the ground floor with his housekeeper, Anna Lovisa Petterson. Hans Arreboe Clausen, a businessman (grosserer) and consul-general, resided on the first floor with his wife Asa Clausen (née Sandholt), their granddaughter Olga Emily Clausen, a coachman and two maids. Villiam Ludvig Christian Jensen, a helmsman, resided on the second floor with his wife Thyra Dagmar Agnes Louise Jensen (née Marck) and one lodger. Niels Adolph Bagger, a warehouse worker (pakhusformand), resided in the basement with his wife Karen Emilie Vilhelmine Bagger and their 10-year-old son Charles Arreboe Christian Bagger.

=== The new building ===
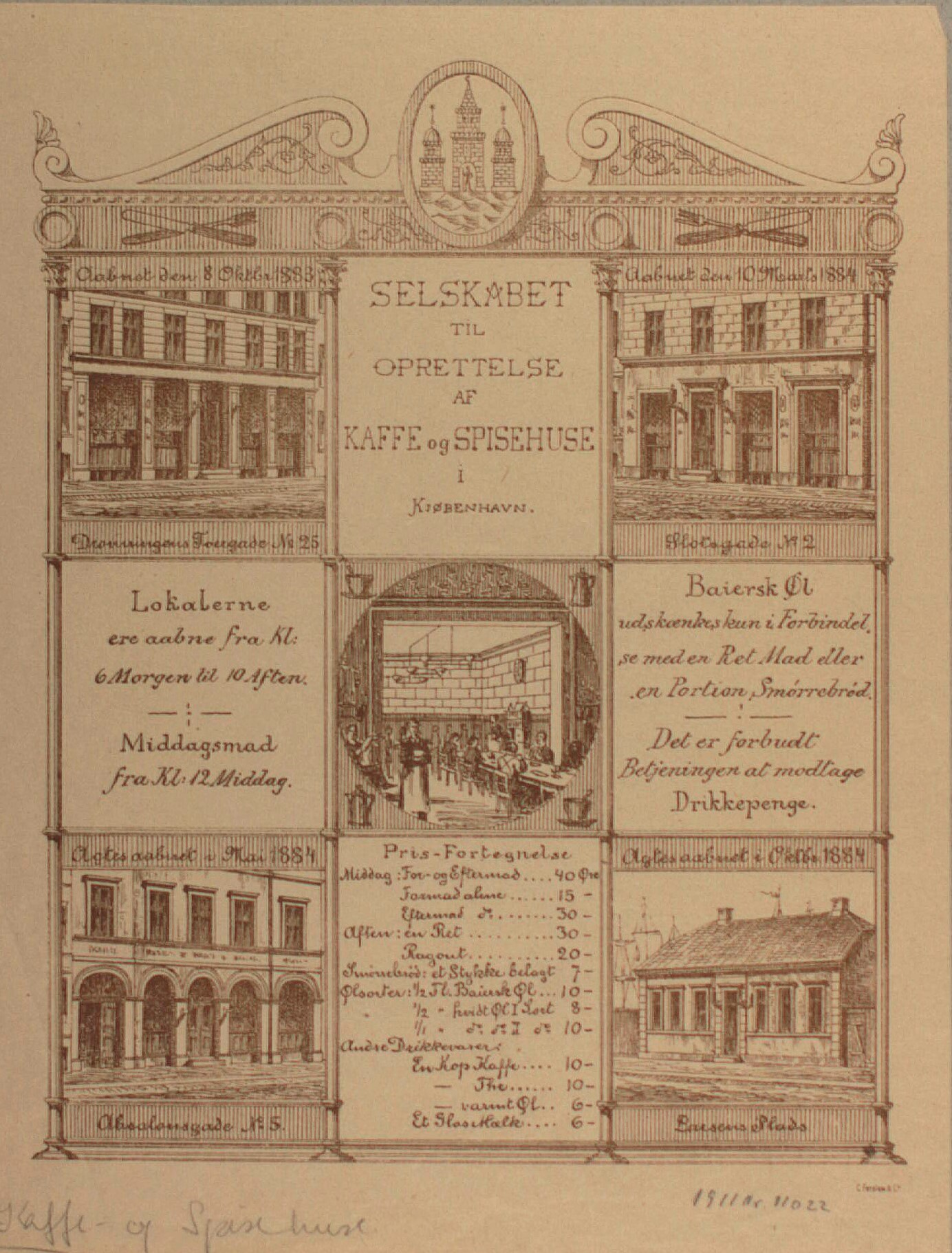
Selskabet til Oprettelse af Kaffe og Spisehuse.

The present building on the site was constructed in 1887 for the Society for the Construction of Public Dining and Coffee Houses in Copenhagen (Danish: Selskabet til Oprettelse af Kaffe- og Spisehuse i Kjøbenhavn). The building was designed by Frederik Bøttger. The society was established in 1883 with the aim of establishing public dining facilities with hot and cold meals as well as coffee and beer but without wine and hard liquor. Being a non-profit organisation, profits could not exceed 5% p.a.. The society discontinued its activities in 1899. Its building in Christianshavn was already in 1893 sold to C. Ferslew & Co. and converted into a printing workshop.

In 1935, C. Ferslwew & Co. purchased Wildersgade 20 and Wildersgade 22 on the other side of the block. A large new rear wing in funkis style was constructed in 1936.

== Architecture ==
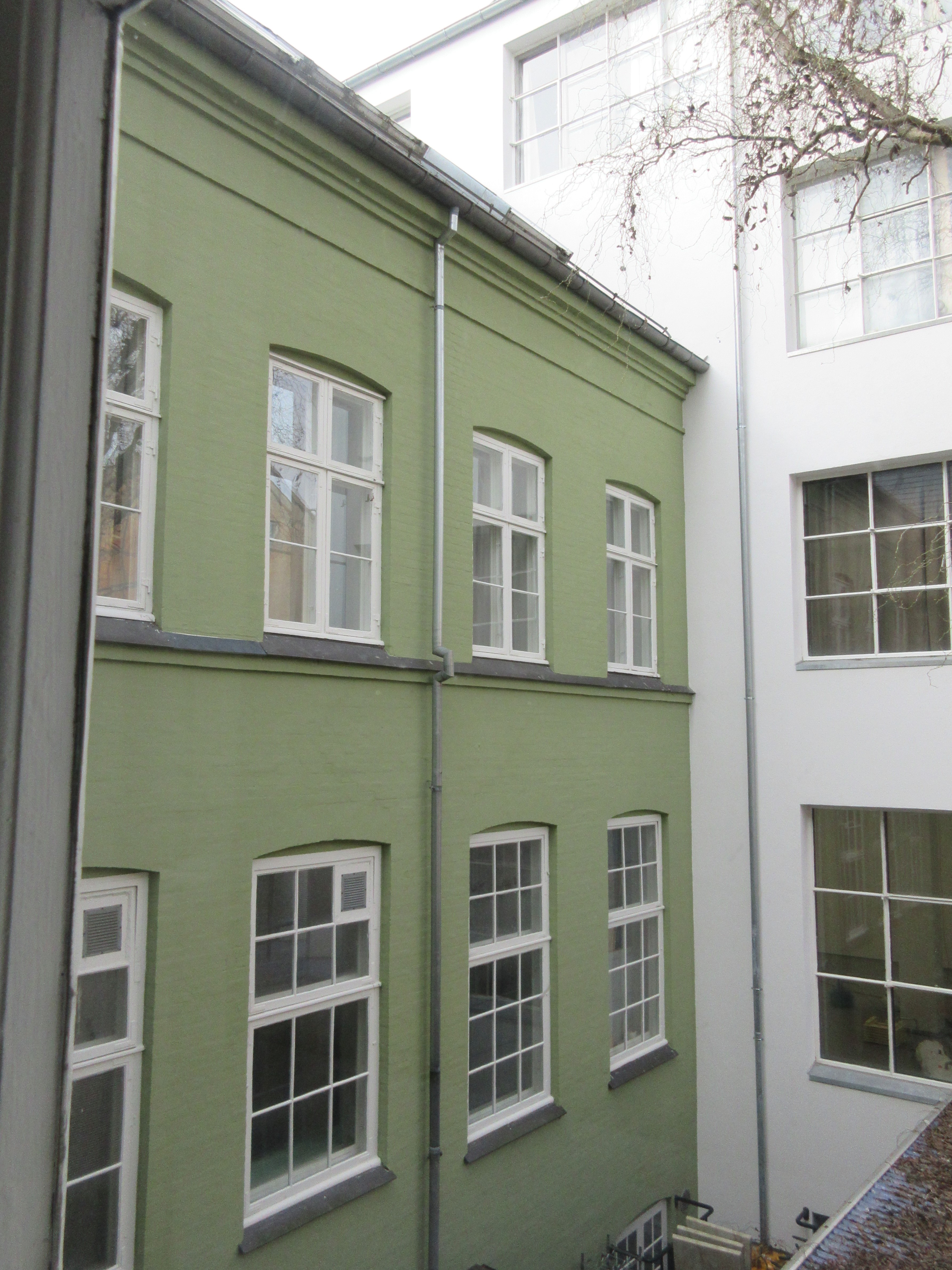
The rear wing from 1936 viewed from the central staircase.

Overgaden Neden Vandet 17 is constructed in red brick on a foundation of granite ashlars with two storeys over a walk-out basement. The seven-bays-wide facade is richly decorated with pattern brickwork, glazed details and other ornamental features. The bay with the main entrance furthest to the right is wider than the six other bays. The monumental doorway is topped by a fanlight. Above the main entrance is a medallion with a relief of the three towers from Copenhagen's coat of arms. The windows of the six other bays are placed in a slightly recessed niche with a dentillated upper edge. Other decorative elements include sill courses and an ornamental cornice. The roof is clad in black slate and features four large dormer windows with carved woodwork towards the street. The roof ridge is pierced by three chimneys. A side wing extends from the rear side of the building along one side of the central courtyard. It is connected to the funkis-style rear wing from 1936.

== Today ==
O—Overgaden is a non-profit art institution with an irreverent program of emerging Danish and international artists. It hosts approximately eight major exhibitions each year. Other activities include concerts, populated parlors, performances, book talks, workshop sessions, and film screenings.

O—Overgaden is an independent, non-profit institution with funding from the Danish Arts Foundation. The board consists of Mikkel Bogh (chair, director of the National Gallery of Denmark), Ruth Campau (artist), Mette Winckelmann (artist), Ebbe Stub Wittrup (artist), Matias Møl Dalsgaard (CEO, GoMore), Helle Brøns (Curator, Sorø Art Museum) and Jens Lund Mosbek (lawyer, Kromann Reumert).

O—Overgaden's board currently consists of Sanne Kofod Olsen, chair (January 2024 – December 2028), Vice-Chancellor at the Royal Institute of Art in Stockholm; Rasmus Myrup (April 2023 – March 2028), visual artist; Lea Porsager (April 2023 – March 2028), visual artist; Ebbe Stub Wittrup (December 2019 – November 2024), visual artist; Matias Møl Dalsgaard (December 2019 – November 2024), CEO, GoMore; Helle Brøns (August 2020 – July 2025), curator, Sorø Art Museum; and Ieben Christensen (April 2022 – March 2027), lawyer, M/S2 Holden Aps.
