= Jean Christian Ferslew =

Danish newspaper publisher and paper manufacturer (1836–1910)

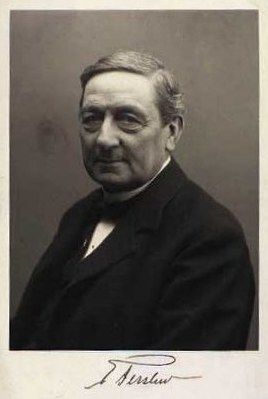
- Ferslew photographed by Adolph Lønborg
- Born: 3 March 1836; Copenhagen, Denmark
- Died: 6 July 1910 (aged 74); Copenhagen, Denmark
- Resting place: Cemetery of Holmen
- Occupation(s): Publisher, industrialist
- Awards: Knight of the Order of the Dannebrog

Jean Christian Ferslew (3 March 1836 – 6 July 1910) was a Danish newspaper publisher and paper manufacturer. He inherited a small printing business in the 1850s which under his management as C. Ferslew & Co. developed into the largest Danish newspaper publishing company of the late 19th and early 20th century. He also established a paper mill in Frederiksberg.

== Early life and education ==
Ferslew was born on 3 March 1836 in Copenhagenm the eldest son of Martinus William Ferslew (1801–52) and Lassenia Ferslew née Meyer (1807–63). His father established a small printing business in 1842. It operated under the name Bing & Ferslew after Herman Jacob Bing (1776-1844) became a partner in 1849. They later also established a type foundry.

Ferslew was originally intended for a career as an engraver but following his father's early death he was instead sent to Berlin to apprentice as a lithographer in 1854.

== Career ==
Ferslew returned to Copenhagen in late 1855 to work in the family firm. In 1856, he imported a lithography press from Germany, which was the first of its kind in Denmark. The collaboration with the much elder Bing was not without difficulties but Ferslew often came out with the upper hand and, on 1 October 1857, bought him out of the company in a partnership with lithographer Philip Berendt. The company was renamed C. Ferslew & Co.. It purchased the building at Store Kongensgade 24.

Ferskew moved into the market for newspaper publication when he released the first issue of Kjøbenhavns Dags-Telegraph on 2 January 1864. It was initially an advertisement pamphlet but, instigated by the outbreak of the Second Schleswig War, he soon decided to turn it into a proper newspaper. He hired C. V. Rimestad as editor-in-chief.

On 29 November 1873, he published Aftenposten for the first time. The newspaper, which was issued twice daily (13.00 and 16.00), was directed at an even broader readership than Dags-Telegraphens and became a big economic success. In 1875, he imported a new rotary printing press from England, which again was the first of its kind in the country.

In 1876, Ferslew commenced the publication of Nationaltidende. It was initially an evening supplement to the Dags-Telegraphen. From 1 October it had both a morning and an evening version, with the evening version as the more substantial one.

In 1877, Ferslew purchased the Hotel Royal Building as a new home for his newspaper publication activities. He installed the first casting machines in the country.

C. V. Rimestad had served as editor both of Dags-Telegraphen and Nationaltidende. Ferslew wanted editorial changes. On 1 January 1878, he engaged H. R. Hiort-Lorenzen as new editor and Emil Bjerring as editorial secretary. This started a new era for Nationaltidende. The number of employees increased considerably. Among the journalists were personalities such as Alex. Thorsøe, Angul Hammerich, Vilhelm Østergaard, R. Besthorn, Peter Nansen, Carl Ewald, Mathilda Malling and (from 1879 to 1884) Herman Bang.

In 1881, Ferslew constructed a paper factory in Frederiksberg, which supplied both his own and several other publishing houses with paper for their publications. A few years later he also established a celluloses plant at Kattinge. He also established Centraltrykkeriet in Christianshavn. The building in Store Kongensgade continued to operate as a printing business specialized in the printing of images. It also contained a ship with paper and office articles.

On 14 April 1889, Gerslew acquired Dagens Nyheder which had until then been published by a group of wealthy landowners. On 1 July 1891, he also acquired the newspaper Dagbladet.

== Personal life ==
Ferslew married Anna Johanne Christine Lindholm, (12 September 1837 - 24 October 1904) on 5 November 1858 in Nykøbing Falster. They had two children, Christian Ferslew and Anna Levin.

== See also ==
- J. G. A. Eickhoff
