= Jewish Northern Cemetery (Copenhagen) =

Cemetery in Copenhagen, Denmark

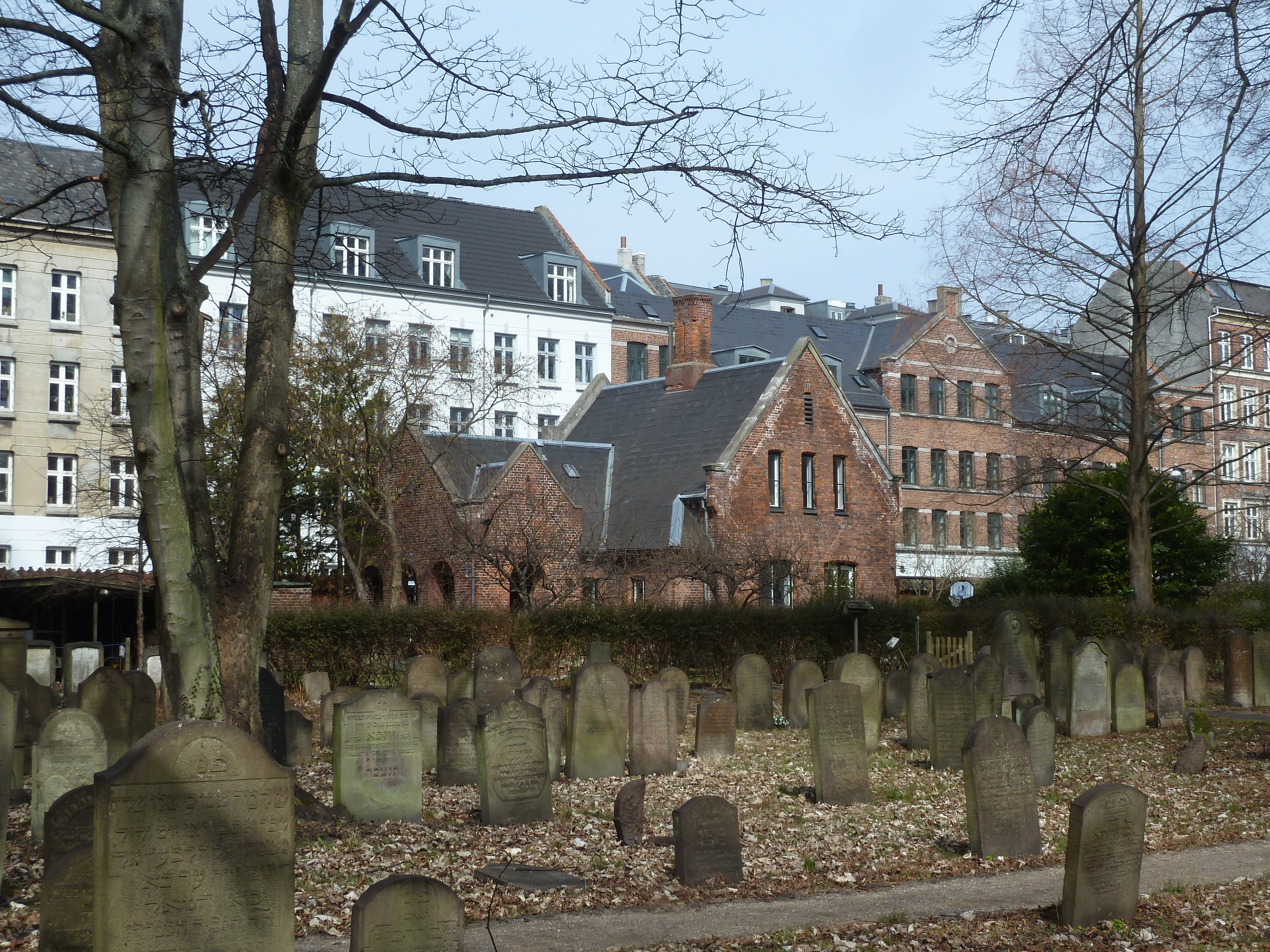
- The gatehouse
- Interactive map of Jewish Northern Cemetery

Details
- Established: 1694
- Location: Nørrebro, Copenhagen
- Country: Denmark
- Coordinates: 55.691°N 12.557°E
- Type: Jewish (closed)
- Size: 13,500
- No. of graves: 5,500

The Jewish Northern Cemetery in Nørrebro was formerly the principal Jewish cemetery in Copenhagen, Denmark. It has an area of 13,500 square metres and contains some 5,500 burials.

== History ==
The Jewish congregation in Copenhagen purchased a 900 square metre site outside the city for use as a burial site in the early 1690s. The oldest burial in the cemetery is from 1694. Further acquisitions of land had brought the cemetery up to its current size by 1854 but it was still passed out of use when a new Jewish cemetery opened in connection with the new Vestre Cemetery.

== Today ==
The brick wall which today surrounds the cemetery on three sides, along Møllegade, Guldbergsgade and Birkegade, was built in 1873 to a design by Vilhelm Tvede. The entrance is on Møllegade. The cemetery was listed in 1983.

== Burials ==
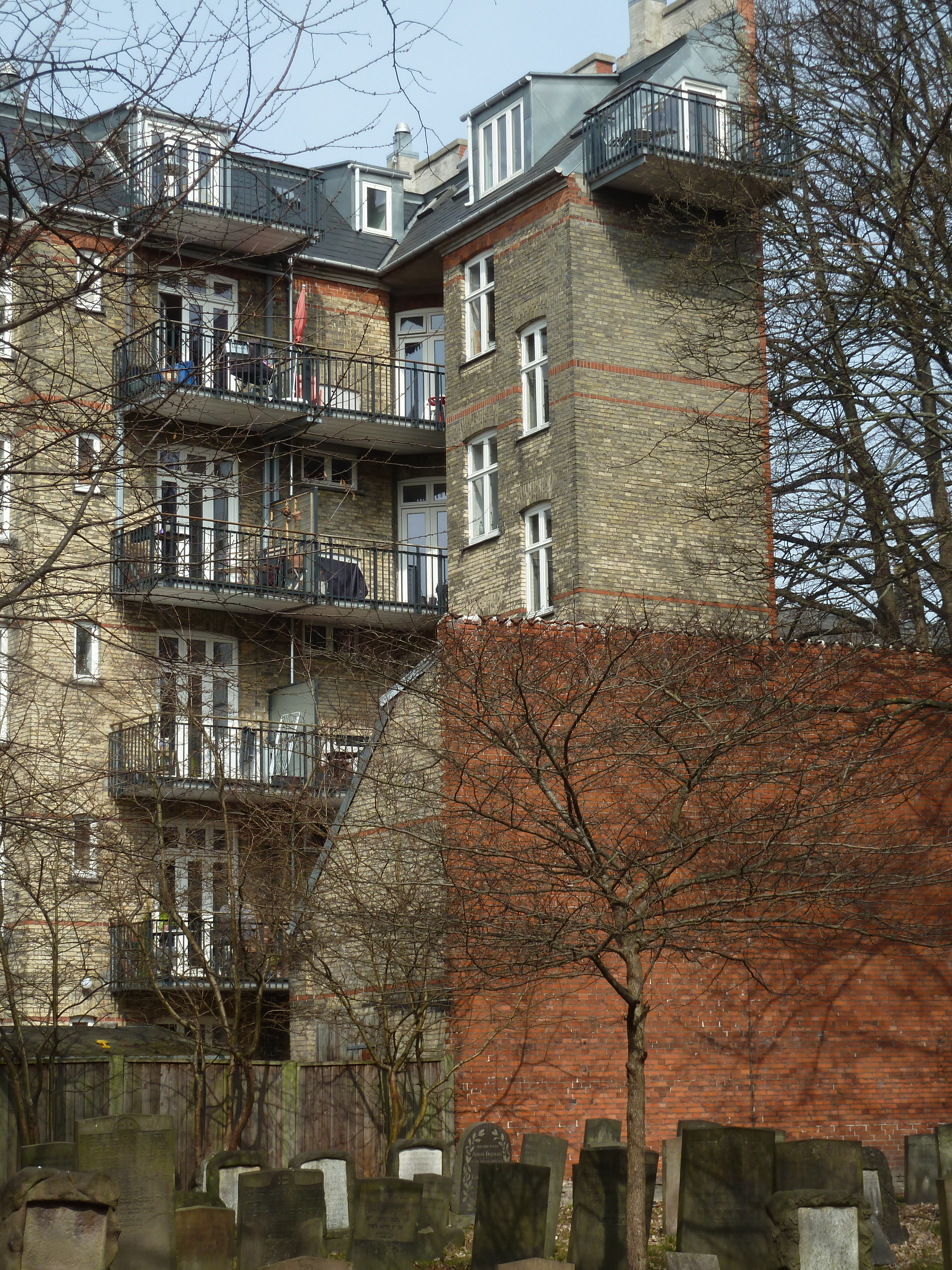
Buildings facing the cemetery

- David Baruch Adler, broker
- Hanna Adler, educator
- Joel Ballin, engraver
- Samuel Jacob Ballin, physician
- Sophus Berendsen, industrialist
- Herman Bing, book dealer
- Jacob Herman Bing, industrialist
- Meyer Herman Bing, industrialist
- Simon Aron Eibeschütz, philanthropist
- Liepmann Fraenckel, portrait painter
- David Halberstadt, merchant
- Ludvig Heckscher, lawyer
- Marie Henriques, painter
- Martin Henriques, banker
- Nathan Henriques, painter
- Sally Henriques, painter
- Samuel Henriques, painter
- Isaac W. Heyman, businessman
- Samuel Jacobi, physician
- Ahron Jacobson, engraver
- Albert Jacobson, ædelstenskærer
- David Ahron Jacobson, engraver
- Salomon Ahron Jacobson, engraver
- Isidor Kalckar, painter
- Israel Levin, linguist
- Moritz Levy, national bank manager
- Moritz G. Melchior, merchant
- Moses Melchior, merchant
- Nathan Melchior, eye surgeon
- Moses Mendel, printer
- Hartvig Philip Rée, merchant
- Salomon Soldin, book dealer
- Arnold Wallick, stage painter
- Abraham Wolff, Chief Rabbi

== Cultural depictions ==
=== Music ===
The Jewish Northern Cemetery is the subject of an instrumental song, "The Jewish Cemetery on Møllegade", by Jóhann Jóhannsson.

== Image gallery ==
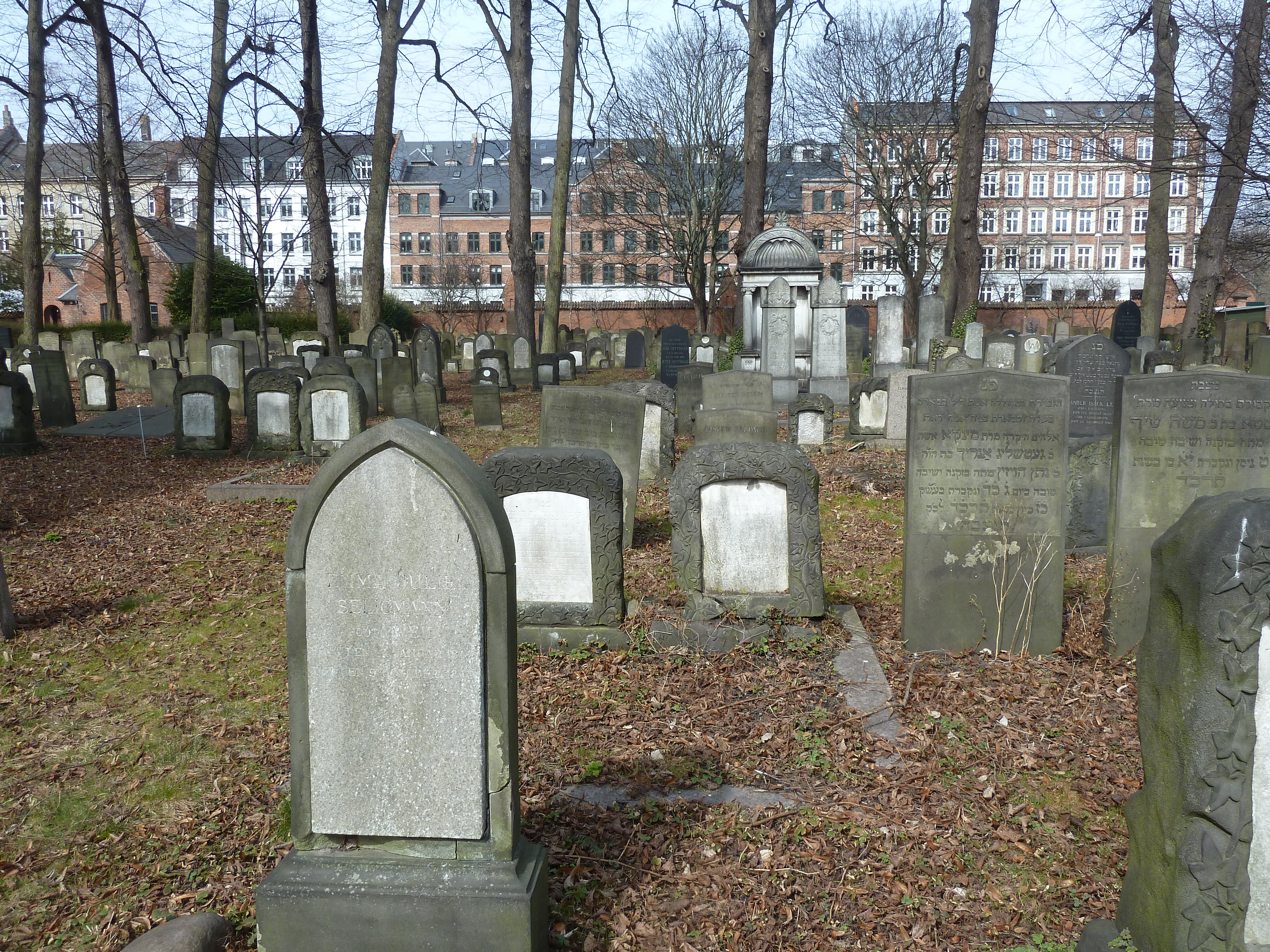

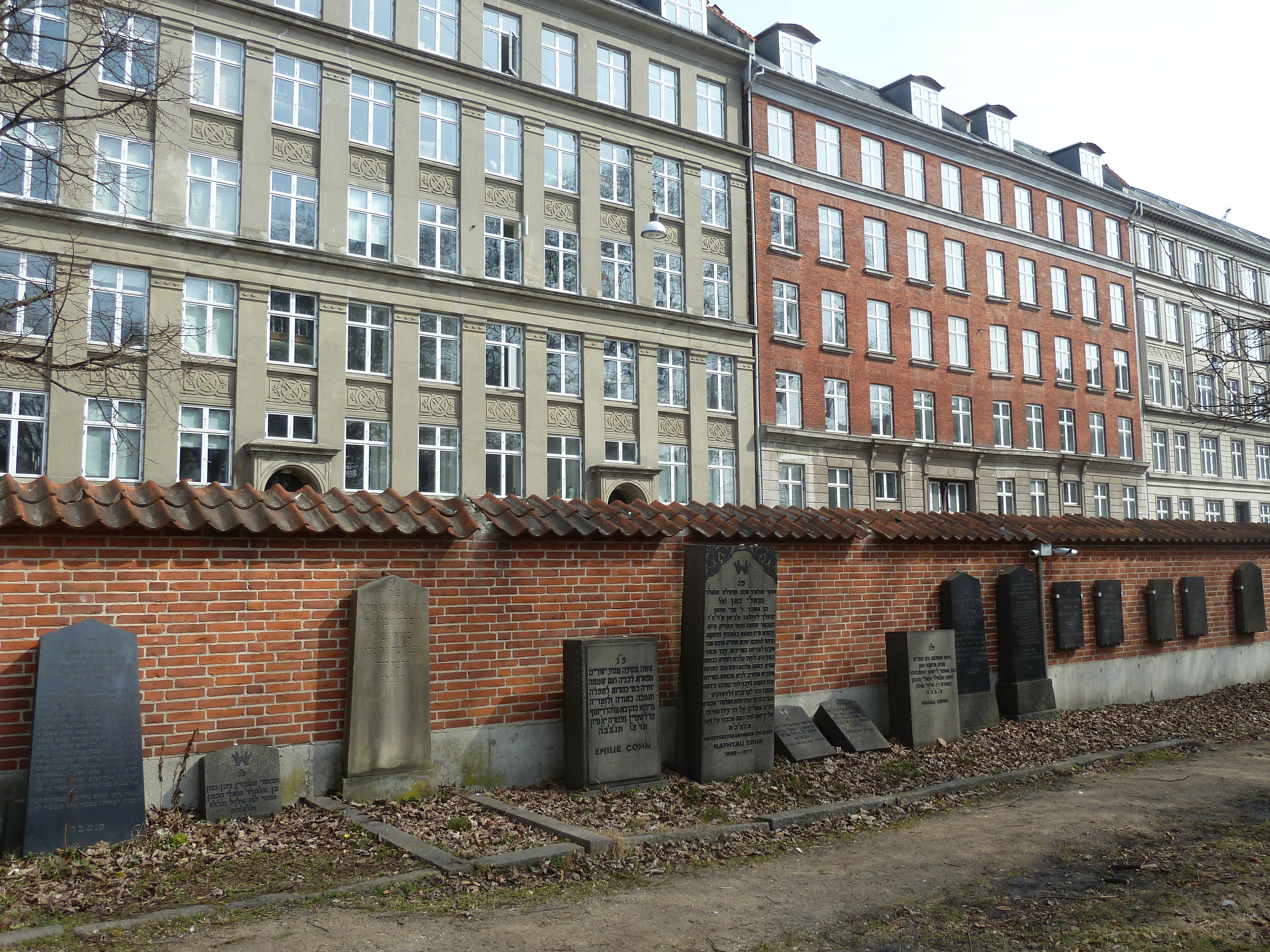

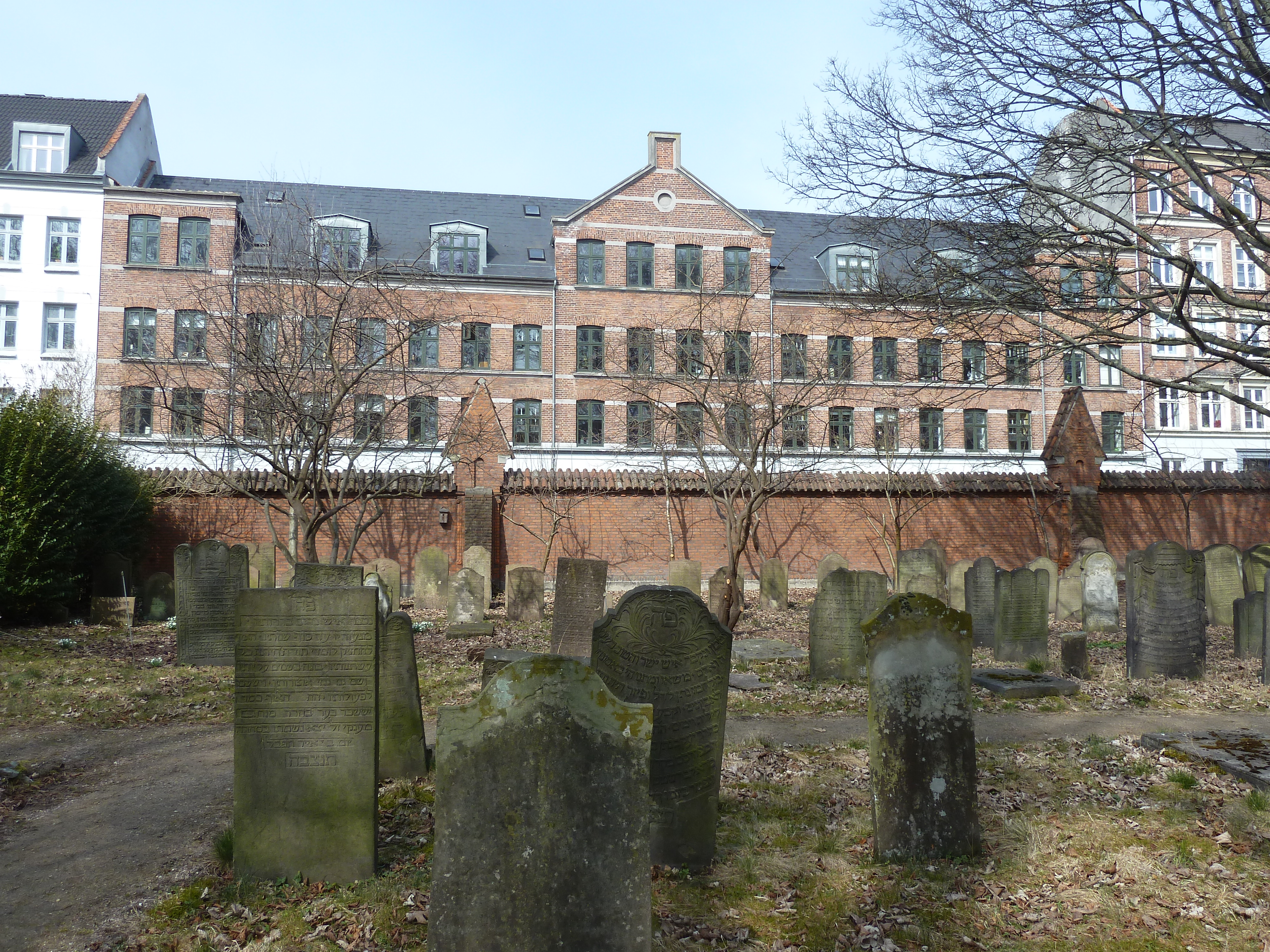

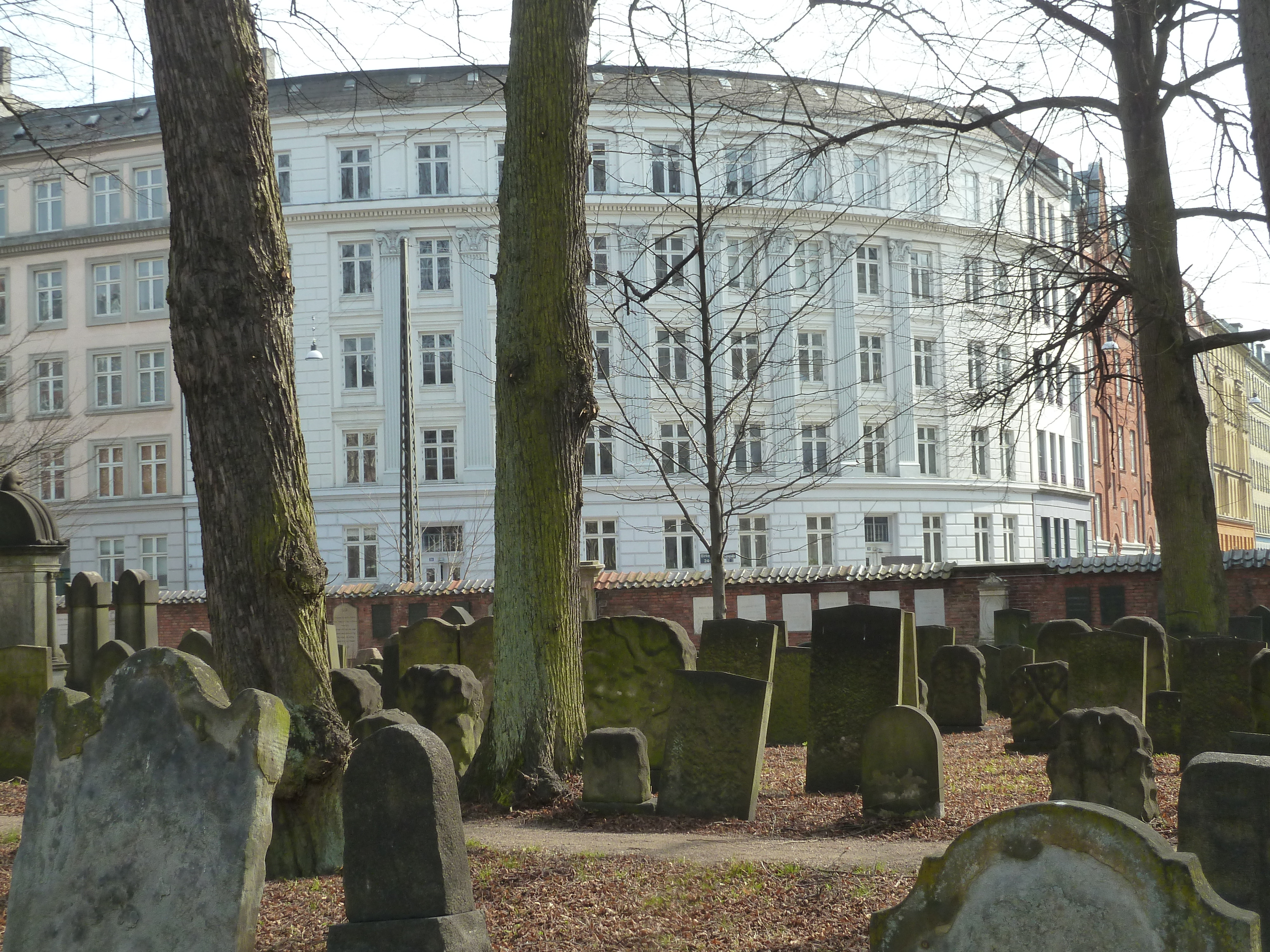

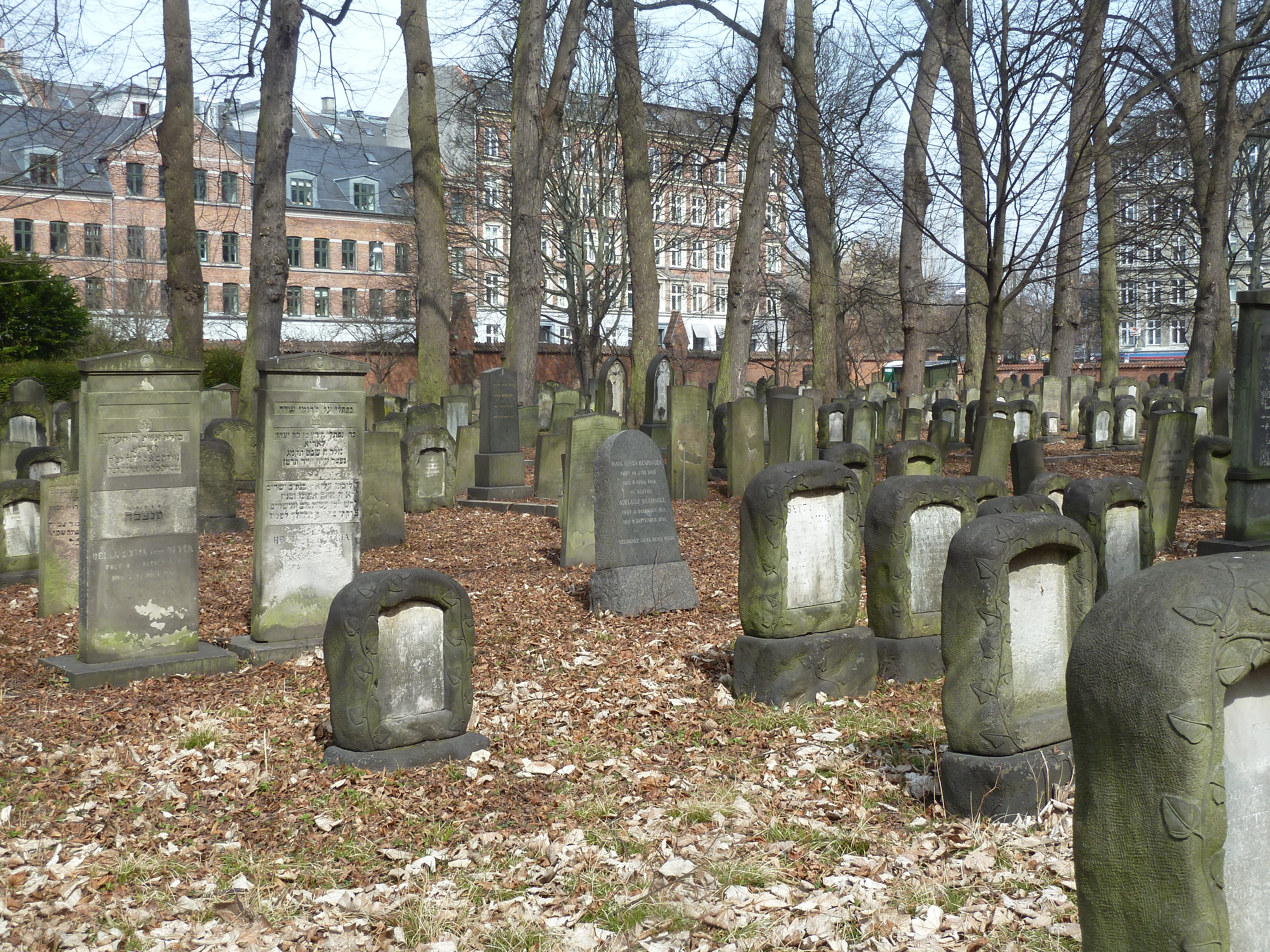

== See also ==
- Great Synagogue (Copenhagen)
