= Overgaden Neden Vandet 15 =

Mid-19th-century property in central Copenhagen, Denmark

Overgaden Neden Vamdet 15
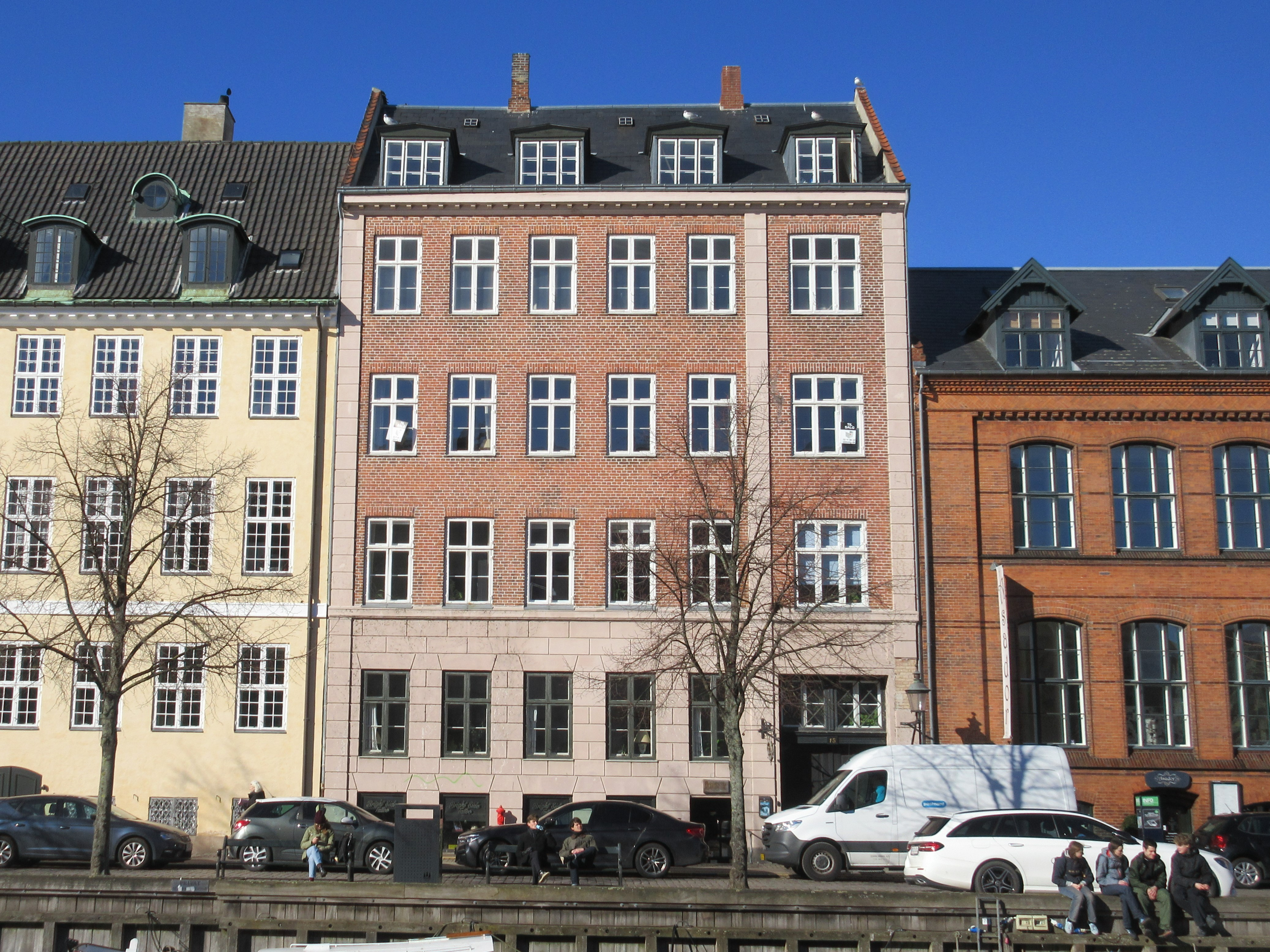
- Interactive map of the Overgaden Neden Vamdet 15 area

General information
- Location: Copenhagen, Denmark
- Coordinates: 55°40′20.42″N 12°35′23.86″E
- Completed: 1858

Overgaden Neden Vandet 15 is a mid-19th-century property overlooking the Christianshavn Canal in the Christianshavn neighborhood of central Copenhagen, Denmark. It consists of an L-shaped building with high-end apartments from 1858 fronting the street and an older rear wing now used as office space, ateliers and storage space. The two buildings were both listed in the Danish registry of protected buildings and places in 1980. Notable former residents include the businessman Peter Heering and the author Henrik Pontopidan.

== History ==
=== 18th century ===
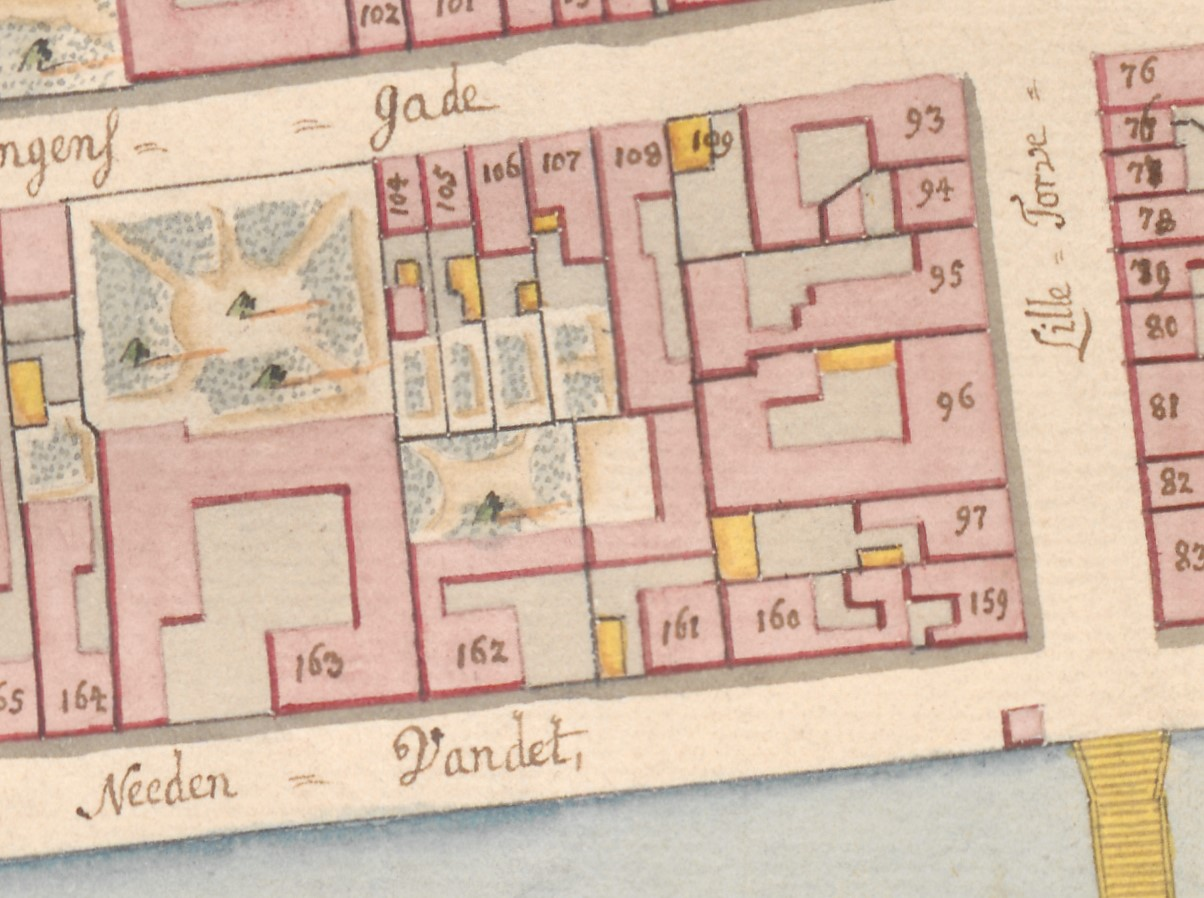
No. 162 seen on a detail from Christian Gedde's map of Christianshavn Quarter, 1757

Overgaden Neden Vamdet 15 and Overgaden Neden Vamdet 17 were originally part of the same property. It was owned by distiller and timber merchant Claus Byssing in 1675. The only building on the property was then a building with shed roof pulled back from the street. The rest of the property was used for the storage of timber. Byssing's property was listed in Copenhagen's first cadastre from 1689 as No. 93 in Christianshavn Quarter. It was later divided into two separate properties. The property now known as Overgaden Neden Vamdet 15 was listed in the new cadastre of 1756 as No. 162 in Christianshavn Quarter. It belonged to anchor smith Jonas Jochumsen Lund. The other property was listed as No. 161 and belonged to ekviopagemester Chrisitan Frederiks Irgens,

=== 1800–1840 ===
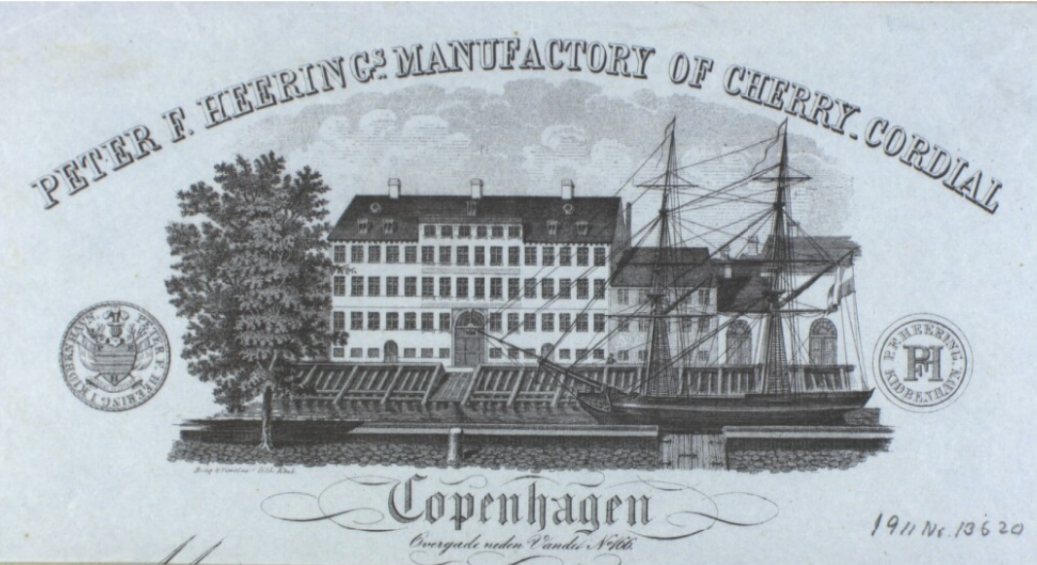
The old building just visible behind the ship masts on an advert for Cherry Heering

The property was owned by merchant (grosserer) Niels Brock Sommerfeldt at the 1801 census. He resided in the building with his wife Friderica Charlotte Sees, 57-year-old Magdalene Nørager, Johan Georg Nielsen (theology student), clerk Friderich Christ. Amodsen, one maid and one coachman.

Sommerfeldt parted with the property after acquiring the Niels Brock House in Strandgade a few years later. His old property was listed as No. 165 in the new cadastre of 1806. It was then owned by N. Guldager. A section of the property was transferred to No. 164 in 1822.

The property was home to seven residents in three households at the 1840 census. Adolph Wilhelm Schander, a helmsman, resided in the building with his wife Jorane Gondersen and their seven-year-old daughter Wilhelmine Schander. Rebekka Henning and Juliane Lomann, two unmarried women, both of them employed with needlework, resided in another dwelling. The third household consisted of joiner Nicolay Carl Bochsen and his wife Sofie Schmidt.

=== Pfeiffer and the new building ===
The property was later acquired by master cooper Ludvig Carl Rasmus Pheiffer (1809-1873). He resided on the first floor at the 1845 census. He lived there with his wife Jacobine Pheiffer, their daughter Caroline, their son Edvard, three cooper's apprentices and one lodger. The first-floor apartment was still occupied by Pheiffer and his wife at the 1850 census. They now lived there with four children and three apprentices. Pheiffer kept the property after moving to Gentofte in around 1854. In 1858–59, he replaced it with the present building on the site. The new building was listed as Overgaden Neden Vandet 15 when house numbering was introduced the same year as a supplement to the old cadastral numbers (by quarter).

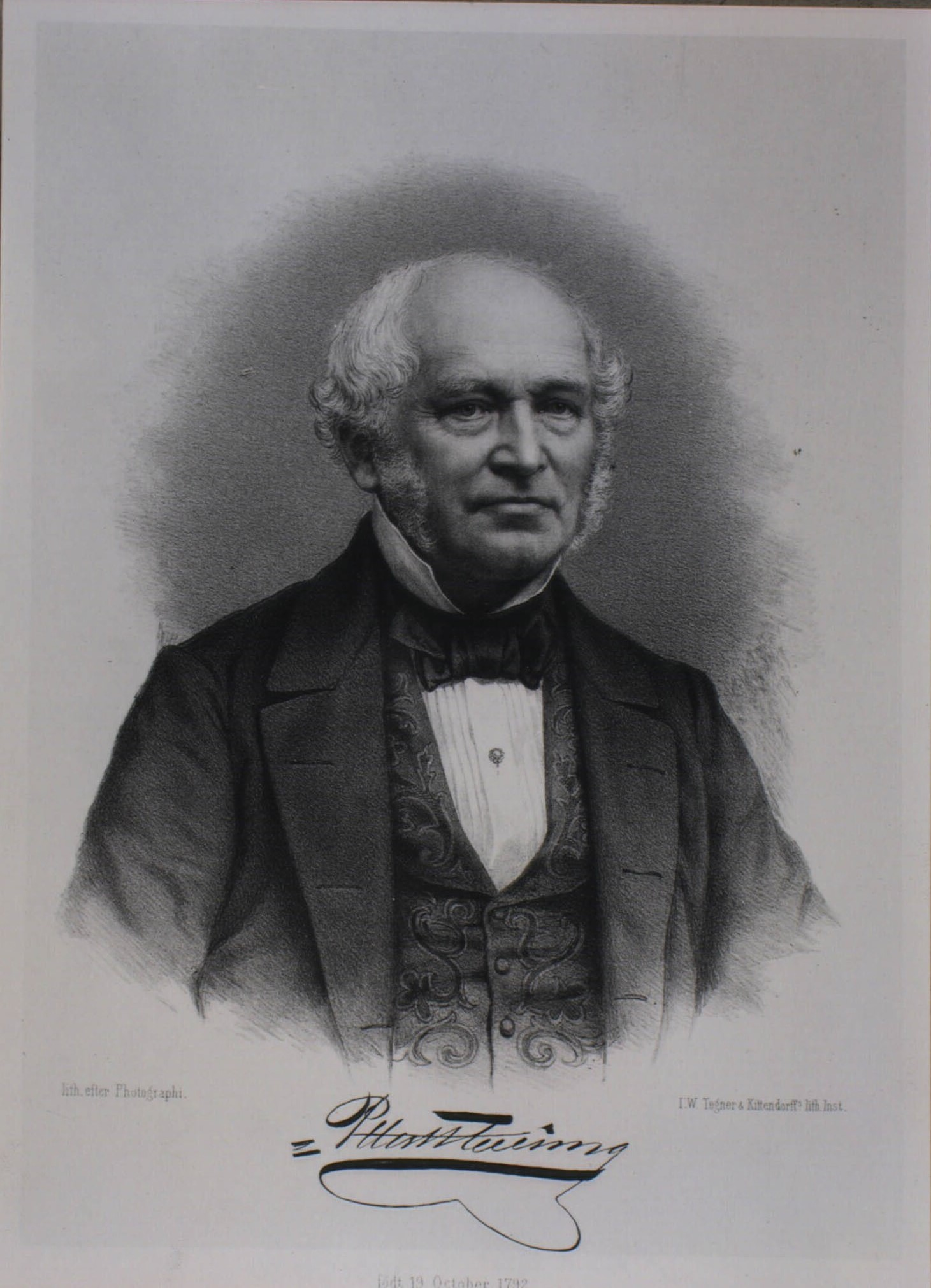
Peter Heering

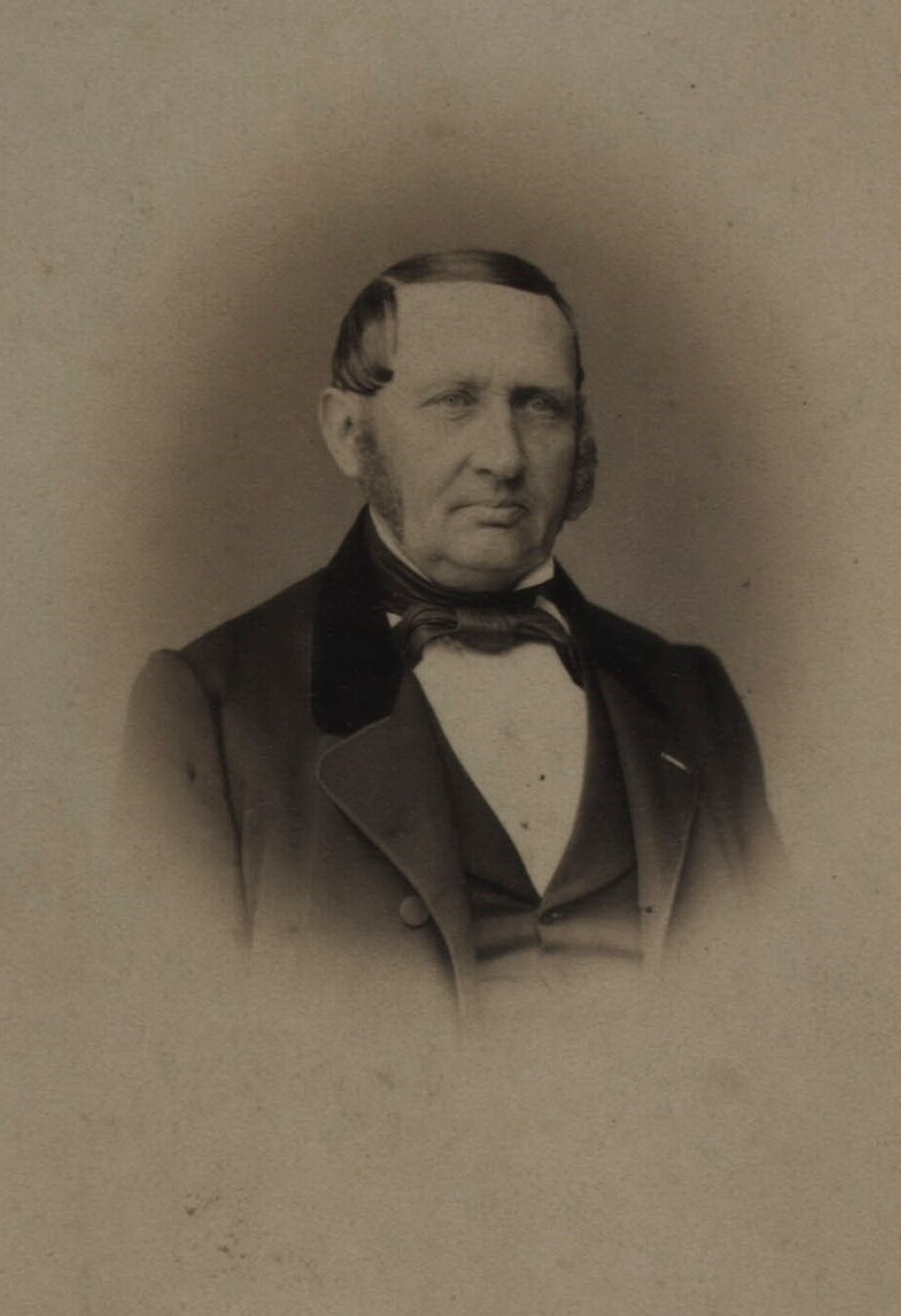
Hans Arreboe Clausen

The property was home to 64 residents in nine households at the 1860 census. Ludvig Chr. Pfeiffer resided in one of the ground floor apartments with his wife Jakobine M. Pfeifferm their three children (aged 12 to 22) and one maid. Charlotte Louise Margrethe Albeck (née Sylxen), widow of the businessman Carl Emilius Albeck (1792-1857), resided on the ground floor with two of her children (aged 21 and 23) and one maid. Ole Christian Green, a businessman (grosserer), resided on the first floor with his wife Caroline Dorothea (née Jensen), their four sons (aged 10 to 23), his sister-in-law Herlich Catharine Jensen and one maid. Frederik Ludvig August Wencken, a clerk (handelsbetjent), resided on the first floor with a housekeeper, three male servants and three maids. Johan Wilhelm Kummerlehn, a helmsman, resided on the second floor with his wife Thora Alvilde Kummerlehn (née Rummelhoff), their two children (aged five and seven), his mother-in-law Charlotte Amalie Rummelhoff (née Denstadt), his wife's niece Charlotte Amalie Saunom and one maid. Nicolaj Jonathan Meinert, a businessman (grosserer), resided in the other second floor apartment with his wife Mette Christine (née Tang), their five children (aged 27 to 40) and two maids. Peter Frederik Heering (1792-1875), a businessman (grosserer) and the iwner of the adjacent Heering House, resided in another apartment with his wife Karen Nicoline (née Mørk), their six children (aged 17 to 25) and his 30-year-old niece Christiane Susanne Heering. Heering's own property is not registered with any residents at the 1860 census and may therefore have been under renovation at the time. Hans Arrebo Clausen (1781-1944), a merchant trading in Iceland, resided in another apartment with his wife Asa Clausen f. Sandholt, their daughter Harriet Clausen, his mother-in-law Gudrun Sandholt (née Jonsen), his sister-in-law Helfridur Høhling (née Sandholt) and her daughter Asa Høhling, one male servant and two maids. Carl Bernhard Theodor Schrøder, another businessman (grosserer), resided in the building with his wife Severine Petrea Nicoline (née Wiborg), his mother-in-law Caroline Christiane Wiborg (née Winther) and one maid.

The property was home to 22 residents at the 1880 census. Jacob Carl Ludvig Pheiffer (1848-1904), Pheiffer's son, now employed as an assistant in the Zealand Railway Company, resided on the ground floor with his wife Maria Madsine Pheiffer, their two children (aged one and three) and one maid. Carl Christian Holm, bookkeeper at an oil mill, resided on the third floor with his wife Julie Emilie Petra Holm (née Holmer), their two children (aged zero and one), a female cook, a nanny and a clerk. Johan Vilhelm Kummerlehn, who had now retired, was still residing on the second floor with his wife Thora Alvilde Kummerlehn, their 24-year-old son Axel Rummelhoff Kummerlehn and two maids. Anders Jensen, principal of a creamery, resided in one of the two third floor apartments with his wife Inger Margrethe Jensen. Rasmus Olsen, a barkeeper, resided in the other third floor apartment with his wife Bodil Kirstine Olsen and one maid.

=== 20th century ===
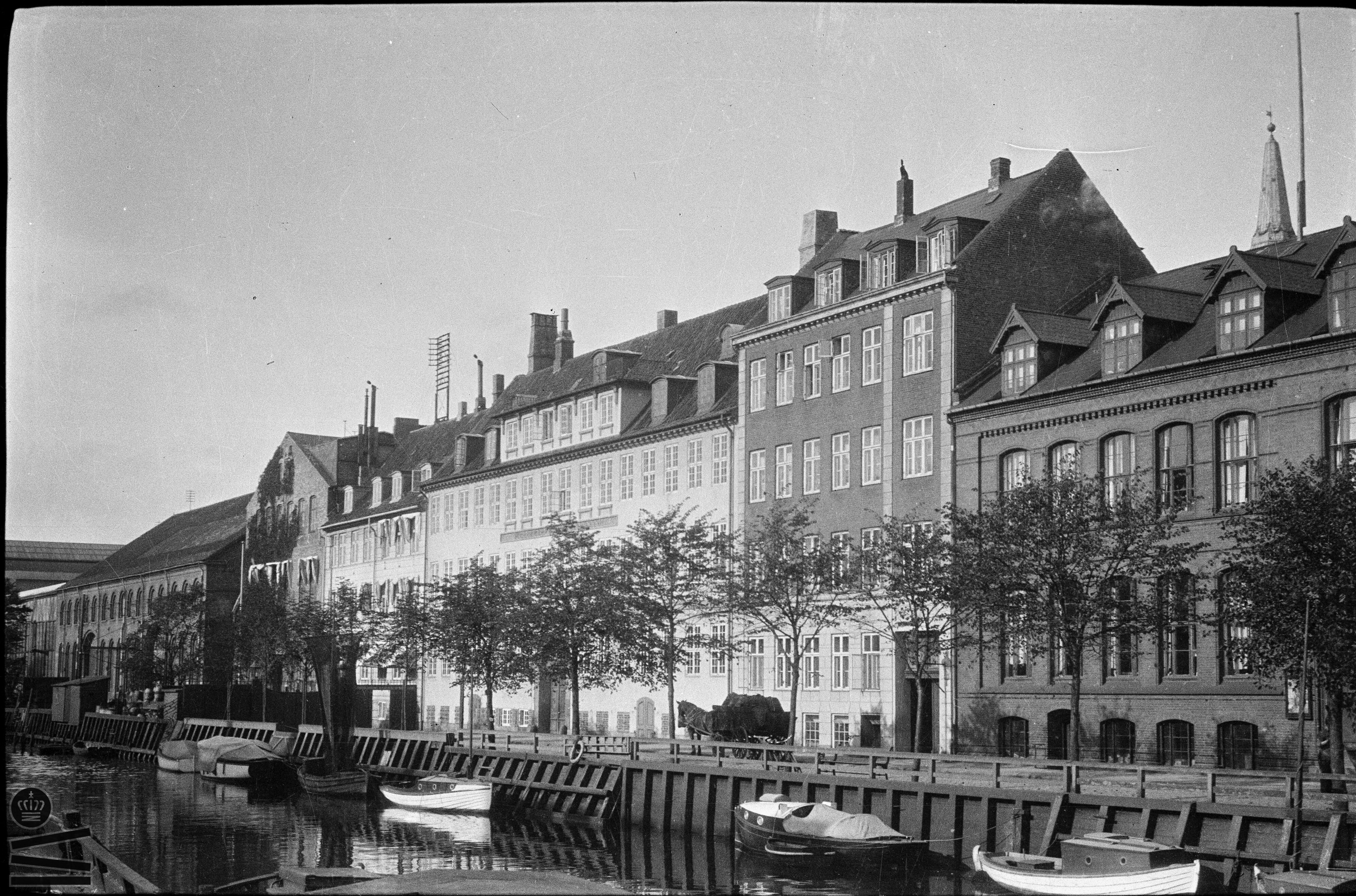
The building in the first half of the 20th century.

The author Henrik Pontoppidan (1857-1943) was a resident of the building from 1919 to 1922. The building was listed in the Danish registry of protected buildings and places in 1980.

== Architecture ==
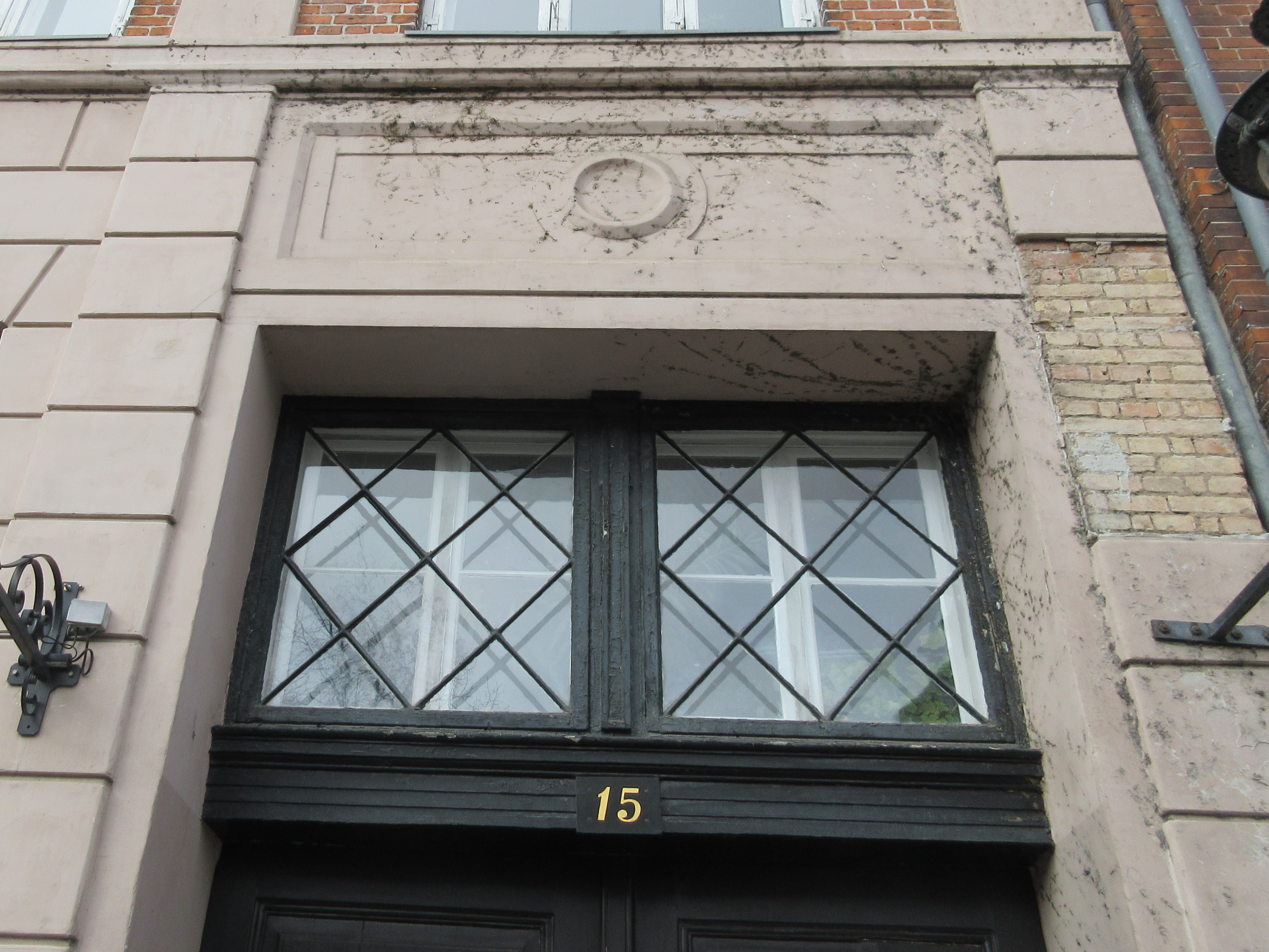
The transom window

Overgaden Neden Vamdet 15 is constructed in red brick on a foundation of granite ashlars with four storeys over a walk-out basement. The facade is six bays wide. The gateway wing furthest to the right (east) is wider than the five other bays. The ground floor is below a belt course plastered and finished with shadow joints. The wider gateway wing and corners of the building are on the upper undressed part of the facade accented with lesenes with shadow joints. The facade is finished by a modilioned cornice. The gate is topped by a large transom window. An old gas lamp is mounted on the facade next to the gate. The pitched roof is clad in black slate. It features four large dormer windows towards the street and two dormer windows towards the yard. A four storey side wing, four bays long, with a chamfered bay furthest to the north, extends from the rear side of the building. The yard side of the main wing and the facade of the side wing are both plastered and ocher coloured. The roof of the side wing features two dormer windows.

The rear wing consists of two sections. The older eastern part of the building was constructed some time between 1816 and 1840. It is four bays long, two storeys tall and topped by a pitched tile roof. The western section of the rear wing dates from 1858–59. It is three bays wide, three storeys tall and pulled back compared to the eastern part of the building. It has three green-painted doors and is topped by a gently sloped, monopitched roof. The facades of both sections are finished with ocher-coloured plastering.

== Today ==
The property is owned by E/F Overgaden Neden Vandet 15 and contains a single condominium on each floor of the front wing. The western part of the rear wing is used as office space and ateliers. The eastern part of the rear wing is used for bicycle parking and as storage space.
