= Meyer Herman Bing =

Danish publisher and merchant

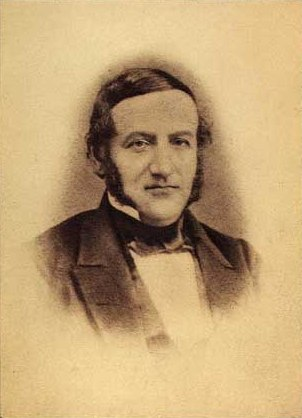
- Meyer Herman Bing
- Born: 4 June 1807; Copenhagen, Denmark
- Died: 15 September 1883 (aged 76); Skovshoved, Denmark
- Occupation: Businessman
- Known for: Bing & Grøndahl

Meyer Herman Bing (4 June 1807 – 15 September 1883) was a Danish businessman. He was a co-founder of Bing & Grøndahl.

== Early life and education ==
Bing was born in Copenhagen, the son of bookseller Herman Jacob Bing (1776–1844) and Sara Meyer (1776–1848).

== Career ==
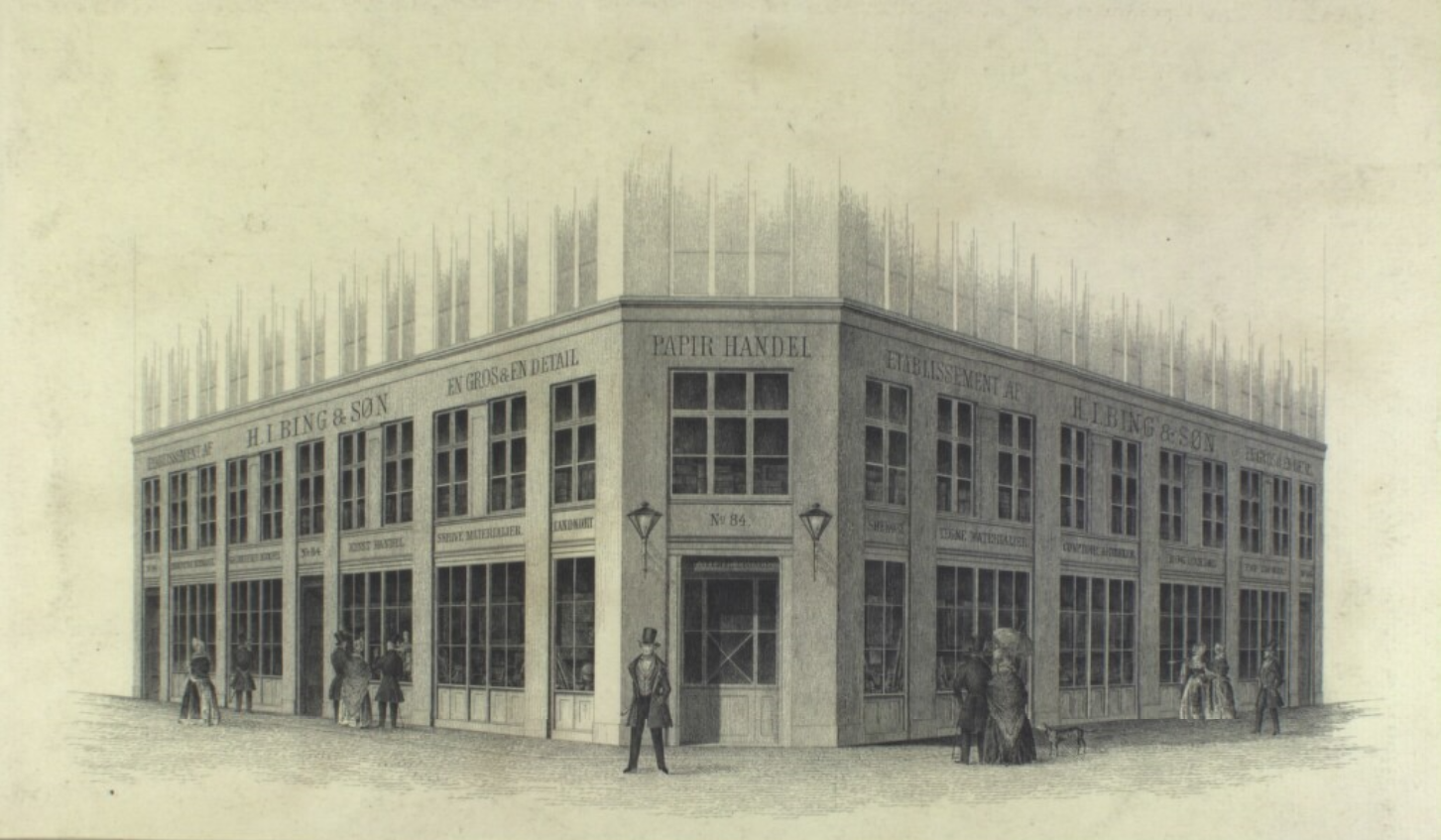
Bing's shop at the corner of Pilestgræde and Sværtegade

Bing started working in his father's book and paper shop as a child. Its name was changed to H. J. Bing & Søn when he became a partner in 1833. He continued the firm in a partnership with his four years younger brother Jacob Herman Bing after his father's retirement in 1838.

He opened a combined art and gallantry shop at the corner of Kronprinsensgade in 1848. It was recognized as the most elegant shop in Copenhagen and was even prior to its official opening visited by Christian VIII. It was one of the first shops in the city with street-level shop windows. Det Bingske Etablissement, as it was now called, was also publishing its own books. The previously founded lithographic workshop Bing & Ferslews lith. Etablissement was expanded with a book printing and stereotype business. This firm was in 1857 taken over by Jean Christian Ferslew and H. J. Bing & søn was in 1863 ceded to Bing's son Jacob Martin Bing and son-in-law Benny Henriques.

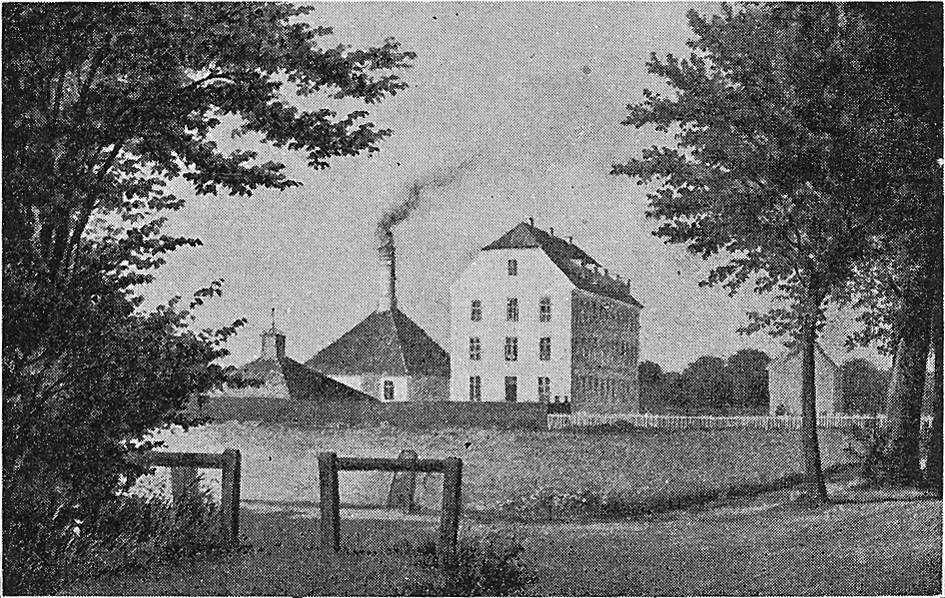
Bing & Grøndahl's factory in 1856

Bing was, together with his brother J. W. Heyman and D. Halberstadt & Komp, also the owner of Christianshavns Dampmølle. He was also planning the establishment of an amusement park in Copenhagen several years prior to Georg Carstensen's establishment of Tivoli Gardens but the plans were never realized.

In 1852, Frederik Viihelm Grøndahl invited the Bing brothers to join him in the establishment of a production of biscuit porcelain figures and reliefs. The Bing brothers were interested but wanted to start a proper porcelain factory with a wider range of products. The first buildings were completed at Vesterbrogade the following year. The factory was faced with considerable adversity from the beginning and Bing was ready to close it when Grøndahl died in 1856, but his brother convinced him to continue the operations.

== Other activities ==
Bing was a member of the Copenhagen City Council from 1858 to 1877. He was president of Industriforeningen from 1868 to 1871. He was also director of the two Jewish schools in Copenhagen.

== Personal life ==
Bing married Eva Simonsen (1809–1883), daughter of textile merchant Levin S. (1780–1843) and Ester Henriques (1785–1852), on 9 November 1831. He was the father of Frederik Bing and Herman Bing (1845–1896). They had the following children:

- Jacob Martin Bing (1833–1903)
- Betzy Louise Bing (18 October 1834 – 1916)
- Frederik Moritz Bing (1839–1912)
- Rosa Bing (25 September 1842 – ?)
- Herman Meyer Bing (1845–1896)
- Laurids Martin Bing (1850–1903)
- August Bing (3 August 1851 – ?)

He died on 15 September 1883 in Skovshoved and is buried in the Jewish Northern Cemetery in Copenhagen.
