= Herman Jacob Bing =

Danish educator and bookseller

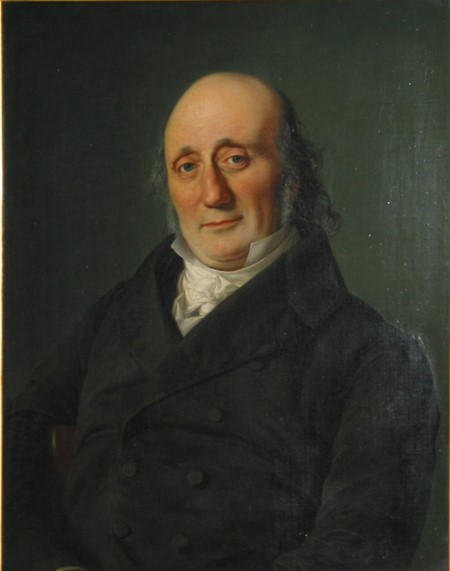
- Bing painted by David Monies, c. 1840
- Born: 16 March 1776; Amsterdam, Dutch Republic
- Died: 10 March 1844 (aged 67); Copenhagen, Denmark
- Occupation: Bookseller

Herman (Heiman) Jacob Bing (16 March 1776 - 10 March 1844) was a Jewish-Danish educator and bookseller. He was a co-founder of Copenhagen's first Jewish school (Bing & Kalich's Institute) in 1803 and established a book shop in 1820 which was later continued by his sons Meyer Herman Bing and Jacob Herman Bing under the name H. J. Bing & Søn. His sons were also co-founders of the Bing & Grøndahl porcelain factory while his grandson Harald Bing was a co-founder of the newspaper Politiken.

== Early life and education ==
Bing was born in Amsterdam, the son of Jacob Bing (died 1780) and Jitle Oppenheim (died 1793). His mother's second marriage was to Moses Ruben Renner in Hamburg in April 1787.

== Career ==
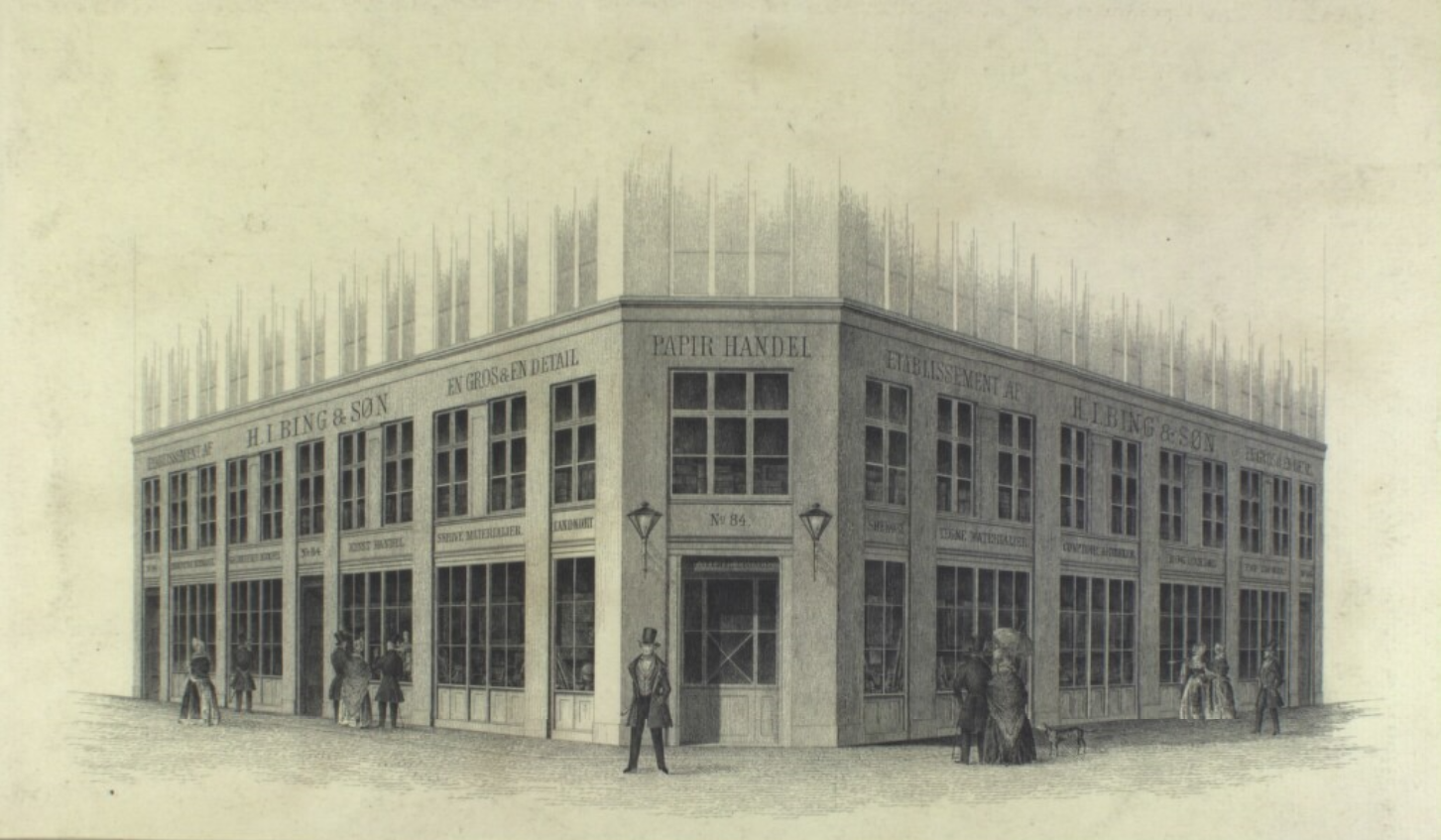
Bing's shop at the corner of Pilestgræde and Sværtegade

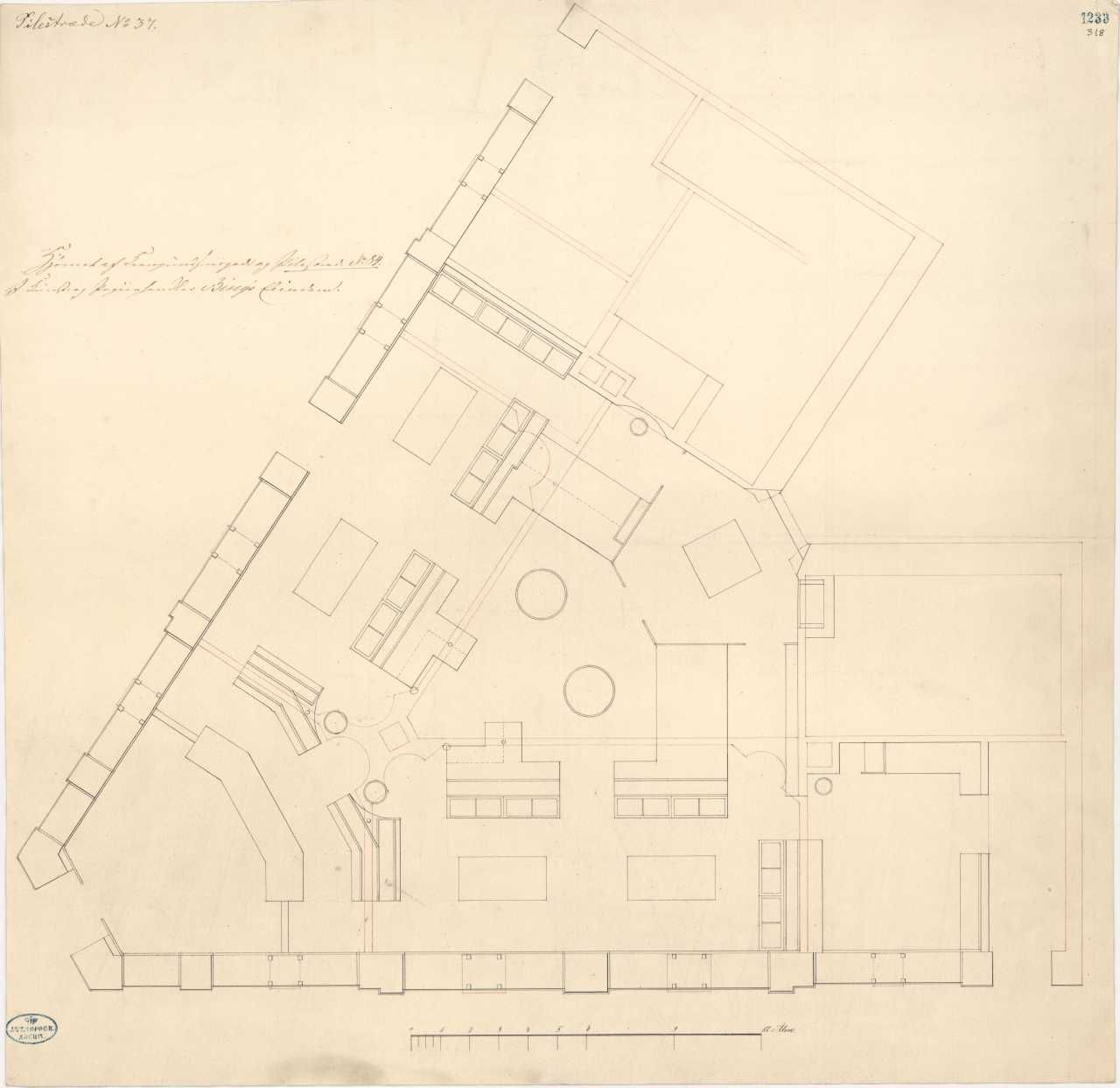
Plan of H. H, Bing's shop in Kronprinsensgade

Bing came to Copenhagen in 1799 where he initially worked as calico printer and later as a tutor in Roskilde.

In 1803, he and his brother-in-law L. J. Kalisch founded a Jewish school. Approximately 400 students had graduated from the school by 1818. It played an important role in the emancipation of the Jewish community but was ultimately unable to support two families. On 10 September 1819, Bing was granted a royal license to open a store with "all materials used for writing and drawing as well as maps and school books". The shop was initially located at the corner of Pilestræde and Sværtegade but later relocated to Kronprinsensgade 36.

Bing's two sons joined the firm and the store developed into one of the leading bookshops in the city. In 1837, Bing was one of the nine founders of the Danish Booksellers' Association.

In 1839, he ceded the bookshop to his two sons, Meyer Herman Bing and Jacob Herman Bing (1811–96). H. J. B. & Søn developed into the leading bookshop in the city under the leadership of Jacob Herman Bing and was from 1863 continued by Meyer Herman Bing's son, Jacob Martin Bing (1833–1903), initially in a partnership with Benny Henriques (1829–1912) but from 1866 alone. It closed in 1885.

== Personal life ==
Bing married Sara Meyer, (1776-1848), a daughter of merchant Meyer Isaac (1741–1800) and Sara Meyer Hausen (1755–1824), on 12 June 1805.

He was a member of the Jewish congregation's board of representatives and director of the Jewish girls' school Carolineskolen.

He died on 10 March 1844 and is buried in the Jewish Northern Cemetery (grave no. G-6-10) in Copenhagen.

== See also ==
- H. J. Bing & Søn
