= J. G. A. Eickhoff =

Former Danish machine factory

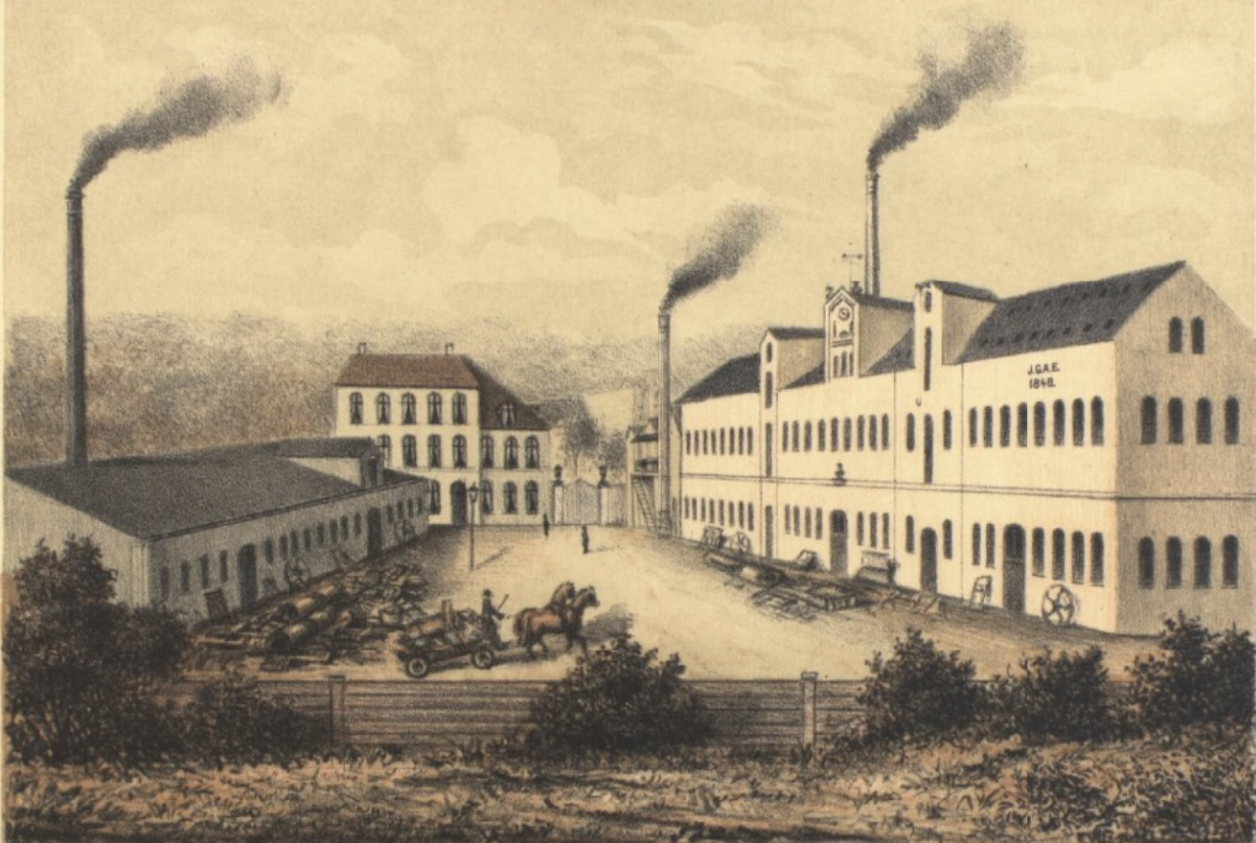
The factory at Vesterbrogade 97 in Copenhagen

J. G. A. Eickhoff was a Danish machine factory and iron foundry based in Copenhagen, Denmark. It specialized in machines and other equipment for the bookprinting, lithography and bookbinding industries. The factory was located at Vesterbrogade 97 in Vesterbro.

== History ==
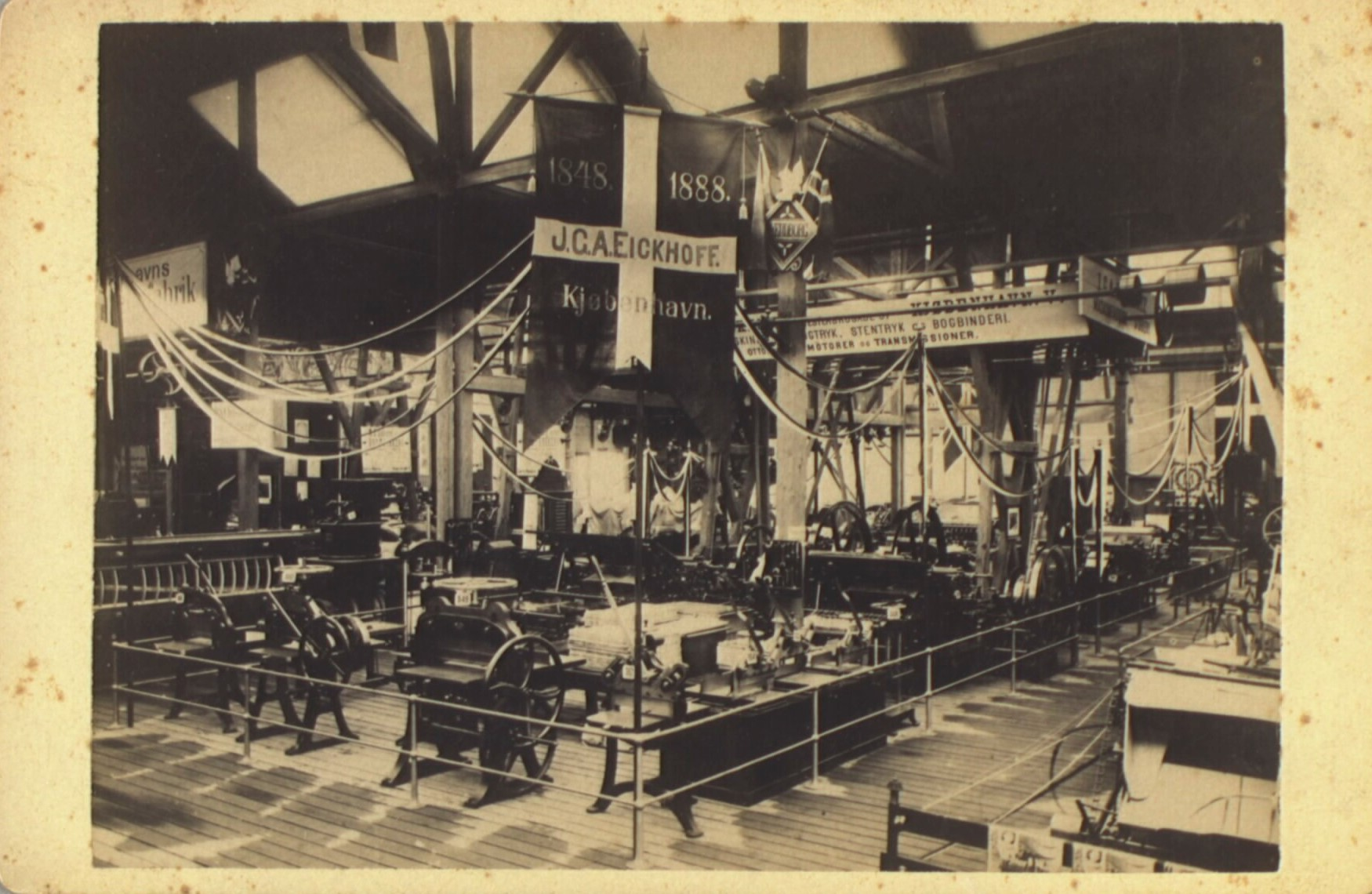
J. G. A. Eickhoff's exhibition at the Nordic Exhibition of 1888 in Copenhagen.

The company was founded by Johan Gottfried August Eickhoff in 1849 and relocated to Vesterbrogade 97 in 1865. The company specialized in machines and other equipment for the bookprinting, lithography and bookbinding industries. The product range also included gas engines. They were used by minor industrial enterprises with no need for the larger steam engines. Many of its products were exported to the Scandinavian market.

The company was owned by the Eickhoff family for several generations. It closed in 1966.

== Legacy ==
An Eickhoff hand press No 81 is on display in the Danish Technical Museum. Det Gamle Trykkeri (The Old Printing Workshop) in Salgelse features an Eickhoff handpress. An Eickhoff handpress is also on display at the Grafiska Museet in Helsingborg.
