= Hartvig Philip Rée =

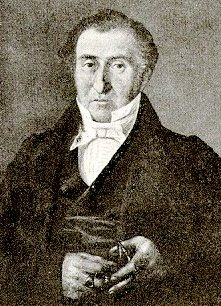
- Hartvig Philip RéeJens Paludan-Müller
- Born: 12 October 1778; Fredericia, Denmark
- Died: 1 October 1859 (aged 87); Copenhagen, Denmark

Hartvig Philip Rée (12 October 1778 – 1 October 1859) was a Jewish-Danish merchant and author who built a large shipping and trade business to become one of the wealthiest people of his time. He created the first Jewish cemetery and synagogue in Aarhus at a time when Jews were frequently discriminated against and the Jewish population was negligible. He published a number of written works, mostly related to Jewish theology but also dealing with broader subjects such as economics.

== Early life and education ==
Rée was born in Fredericia to the German merchant Philip Hartvig Rée (1744–99) and his wife Hanna Hartvig (1759–1830) who had immigrated from Hamburg. His parents were spiritually inclined and especially had a desire to study Jewish traditions and history. His father hired tutors and teachers from abroad to teach his children. In combination Rée was given a thorough education in trade which was completed with a several-years long stay in Hamburg with his uncle.

== Career ==
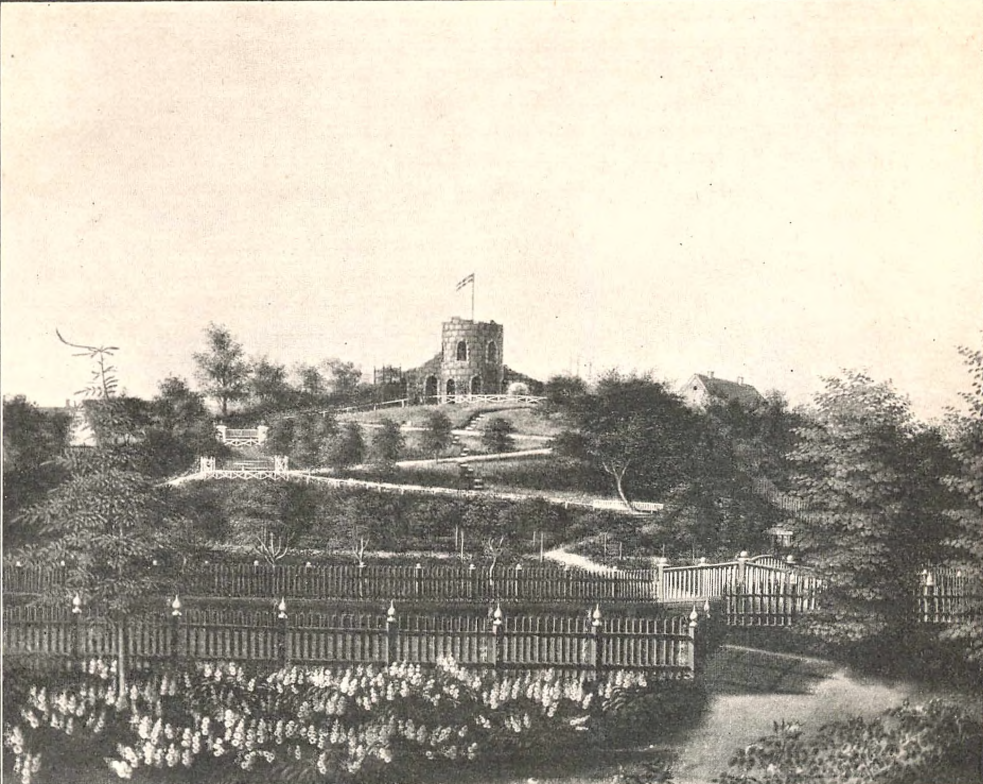
Rée's garden

Rée had to take over his father's business sooner than expected when his father died in 1799. Rée quickly moved his father's business to Aarhus and opened a branch in Randers. He got involved in shipping and started importing coal, iron, salt and hops, and exporting grain, wool, fur and hides. He established a sugar refinery, a print shop, a dye business and a clothes factory in Randers.

Rée became the wealthiest person in Aarhus, according to tax records. He owned Den Rosenørnske Gård in Vestergade, a large mansion by the Aarhus River where he created a large romanticist garden that became famous at his time.

== Other activities ==
In the 1820s, Rée established a synagogue in the first hall of the newly built side building in his estate in Vestergade. He published a number of works, mainly concerned with religious philosophy and theology. He was a proponent of a liberal interpretation of Jewish theology and reforms of Jewish traditions, which he defended in a number of publications in German and Danish. He also published an interpretation of John's Revelation, wrote of national economy, and occasionally wrote some poetry.

== Personal life ==
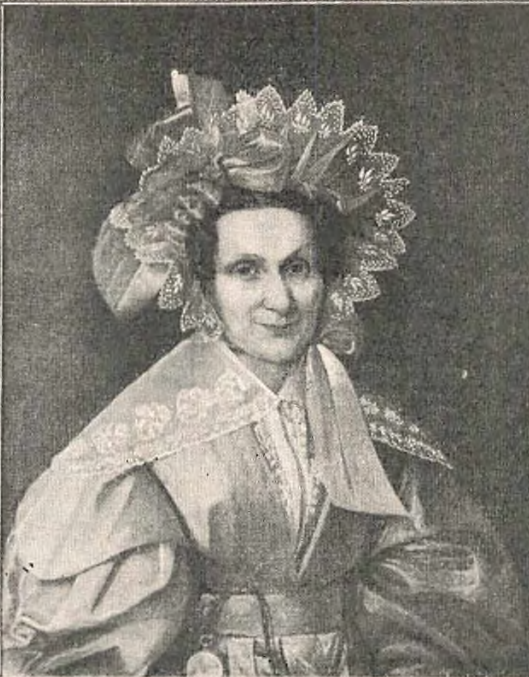
Therese Rée, née Rée

He married his cousin Thamar (Therese) Rée on 12 March 1804. They had a number of children including Hertz Hartvig Rée, Anton Rée, Bernhard Philip Rée, Simon Philip Rée, Israel Philip Rée, Vilhelm Hartvig Rée and Frederikke Privche von Essen.

When his wife died in 1850, Rée lost interest in his business and moved to Copenhagen where he spent the rest of his life in a modest apartment, continuing his studies. His son, Hertz Rée, took over the business.

Rée died in 1859 at Copenhagen.

== Literature ==
- Hartvig Philip Rée und sein Geschlecht. Auf Veranlassung des Herrn Fondsmaklers Direktor Eduard Rée. Herausgegeben von Josef Fischer, 1871-1949. Copenhagen, 1912.
