= Die Verräter – Vertraue Niemandem! =

- Genre: Reality game show
- Created by: Marc Pos
- Based on: De Verraders
- Presented by: Sonja Zietlow
- Country of origin: Germany
- No. of seasons: 3
- No. of episodes: 20

Production
- Production locations: Château de Béguin, Auvergne-Rhone-Alpes, France (2023); Château de Mielmont, Wallonia, Belgium (2024–present)

Original release
- Network: RTL+
- Release: 13 September 2023 – present

Die Verräter – Vertraue Niemandem! (English: "The Traitors – Trust No-One!") is a German reality game show broadcast on RTL since 13 September 2023 and hosted by Sonja Zietlow. It is the German version of The Traitors franchise first broadcast in the Netherlands. Like the original Dutch version but unlike its British and American adaptations, all contestants are celebrities.

The first series was filmed at the Château de Béguin in Lurcy-Lévis, Auvergne-Rhône-Alpes, while all series since the second have been filmed at the Château de Mielmont in Belgium.

== Gameplay ==
Like most versions of the show, sixteen celebrities reside in a castle and are divided into "Loyaler" (Faithfuls) and "Verräter" (Traitors). The Traitors meet in secret and know each other's identities, while the Faithfuls do not. The Traitors meet in a secret Conclave to murder a Faithful each night, usually by sending a "Todesurteil" (death sentence) by letter.

The contestants play minigames during each episode to build up the final prize fund, which can reach up to €50,000, represented throughout the game by silver bars. Some missions have "Schutzschilder" (shields) up for grabs, which protect the winner from murder that night.

The Faithfuls vote a player out of the game at the Round Table in the hope that the player is a Traitor, and players reveal their status in the game once voted out. Unlike in the Australian version for instance, shields do not protect the holder from Banishment. If a player won a "Dolch" (Dagger) during a mission, they receive an extra vote.

If only Faithfuls remain at the end of the game, they split the prize money. If any Traitors remain, the money is split between those left.

== Series ==
Series	Dates aired	Host	Channel	Winning faction	Prize money	Winners
1	13 September – 11 October 2023	Sonja Zietlow	RTL+; RTL	Traitors	€46,500	Anna-Carina Woitschack; Vincent Gross (recruited)
2	10 October – 21 November 2024	Sonja Zietlow	RTL+; RTL	Traitors	€27,500	Oana Nechiti; Jessica Haller (recruited)
3	29 April – 27 May 2025	Sonja Zietlow	RTL+; RTL	Traitors	€44,200	Mirja du Mont; Motsi Mabuse; Charlotte Würdig
4	3 August – 27 August 2026	Sonja Zietlow	RTL+; RTL	Faithfuls	€40,600	Ann-Kathrin Bendixen, Peyman Amin
