= Forræder - Ukendt Grund 2024 =

- Season 1
- Presented by: Martin Johannes Larsen
- No. of castaways: 17
- Winner: Marc Karaket Bach Nielsen
- Runner-up: William Quist
- Location: Hvedholm Castle, Denmark
- No. of episodes: 8

Release
- Original network: TV 2 Echo
- Original release: 12 October – 30 November 2024

Season chronology
- ← Previous; 2024 (Celebrity version) Next → 2025

Forræder - Ukendt Grund (Traitor - Unfamiliar Territory) is the first to consist of civilians of Forræder, the Danish adaptation of The Traitors and the third series to air overall. The season is hosted by Martin Johannes Larsen instead of Lise Rønne, who hosted the first two seasons.

17 ordinary Danes compete against one another to deduce who is faithful and who is a traitor in order to win the grand prize of 250,000kr. The series was filmed on Hvedholm Castle on the island of Funen near Faaborg. The series premiered on TV 2 Echo on 12 October 2024. The series concluded on 30 November 2024 where Marc Karaket Bach Nielsen won as a traitor against faithful William Quist to win the final grand prize of 199,000kr. and was crowned the winner of Forræder - Ukendt Grund.

== Contestants ==
List of Forræder - Ukendt Grund contestants
Contestant	Age	Residence	Affiliation	Finish
Salma Aden	23	Frederiksberg	Faithful	Murdered (Episode 2)
Nicklas Iversen Ekensteen	33	Aarhus	Faithful	Banished (Episode 2)
Frederik Hansen	34	Vejle	Faithful	Murdered (Episode 3)
Nikolaj Ryom	25	Copenhagen	Faithful	Banished (Episode 3)
Anders Boserup Lauridsen	39	Silkeborg	Faithful	Banished (Episode 4)
Ozan Sarıkaya	31	Copenhagen	Faithful	Murdered (Episode 5)
Matias Vestergård Hansen	35	Frederiksberg	Faithful	Banished (Episode 5)
Chilie Lotusflower Mott	31	Frederikssund	Faithful	Murdered (Episode 6)
Birgitte Alme	49	Randers	Faithful	Banished (Episode 6)
Silje Nybye	20	Copenhagen	Faithful	Murdered (Episode 7)
Stefan Ovith Dølby	26	Copenhagen	Traitor	Banished (Episode 7)
Chinasa Ementa	24	Aalborg	Faithful	Murdered (Episode 8)
Regitze Mogensen	34	Valby	Traitor	Banished (Episode 8)
Mathilde Richmann Olsen	25	Copenhagen	Faithful	Banished (Episode 8)
Janne Høgshøj	70	Odense	Faithful	Banished (Episode 8)
William Quist	24	Copenhagen	Faithful	Runner-Up (Episode 8)
Marc Karaket Bach Nielsen	24	Aalborg	Traitor (Note: Marc was recruited as a Traitor at the end of Episode 1.)	Winner (Episode 8)
