= Countship of Brahesminde =

The Countship of Brahesminde (Danish: Grevskabet Brahesminde) was a Danish countship created 9 May 1798 for privy councilor and chamberlain Preben Bille-Brahe of Hvedholm, Damsbo, Stensgård and Østrupgård. The county was dissolved by abolition of the lens system (Lensafløsningen) in 1928.

== Counts ==
- Preben Bille-Brahe (1798–1857)
- Henrik Bille-Brahe (1857–1875)
- Preben Charles Bille-Brahe-Selby
- Henrik Bille-Brahe-Selby
- Jon Carl Preben Bille-Brahe-Selby

== Coat of arms ==
The coat of arms of the count of Bille-Brahe consisted of a divided in four quadrants, the first and fourth of which have vertical stripes in red and white, while the second and third quadrants contain a yellow lily on a blue field. The helm situated above the crest was a horned helmet alternatively in red and white, crowned by a raven. The coat of arms of the later counts of Bille-Brahe-Selby combined the Bille-Brahe arms with the arms of the baron Selby by adding the baron's helmet figure to its center.
