= Forræder - Ukendt Grund 2025 =

- Season 2
- Presented by: Martin Johannes Larsen
- No. of castaways: 18
- Winners: Andreas Brodersen, Charlotte Stang & Sherica Ashlee Zimmermann Fernand
- Location: Hvedholm Castle, Denmark
- No. of episodes: 8

Release
- Original network: TV 2 Echo
- Original release: 20 September – 8 November 2025

Season chronology
- ← Previous; 2024 Next → 2026

Forræder - Ukendt Grund 2025 is the second series of the civilian version of Forræder, Forræder - Ukendt Grund, the Danish adaptation of The Traitors. The season returns to Hvedholm Castle where 18 civilians compete against one another to deduce who is faithful and who is a traitor in order to win the grand prize of 250,000kr. The season premiered on 20 September 2025 on TV 2 Echo.

== Contestants ==
List of Forræder - Ukendt Grund 2025 contestants
Contestant	Age	Residence	Affiliation	Finish
Freja Kronborg Schack	24	Hinnerup	Faithful	Murdered (Episode 1)
Carl-Johan Paulsen	27	Amsterdam, Netherlands	Faithful	Banished (Episode 1)
Oliver Yde	31	Brøndbyøster	Faithful	Murdered (Episode 2)
Henrik "Guido" Guido Gierlevsen	35	Malling	Traitor	Banished (Episode 2)
Zakina Bibi Shah	32	Skovlunde	Faithful	Banished (Episode 3)
Cindy Vu Le	25	Aalborg	Faithful	Murdered (Episode 4)
Marianne Mortensen	67	Aalborg	Traitor	Banished (Episode 4)
Lars Axboe Caspersen	43	Taastrup	Faithful	Murdered (Episode 5)
Julie "Lyck" Lyck	27	Copenhagen	Traitor	Banished (Episode 5)
Mads Norved Dueholm	23	Frederiksberg	Faithful	Murdered (Episode 6)
Kim Jensen	50	Rødovre	Faithful	Banished (Episode 6)
Noah Churchill Sørensen	22	Aarhus	Faithful	Walked (Episode 7)
Niclas Højgaard Brodersen	31	Søborg	Traitor (Note: Niclas started the game as a Faithful but became a Traitor in Episode 6 following an ultimatum.)	Banished (Episode 7)
Juhlie Lotze	21	Køge	Faithful	Murdered (Episode 8)
Laura Lyck	22	Copenhagen	Traitor (Note: Laura started the game as a Faithful but became a Traitor in Episode 5 following an ultimatum.)	Banished (Episode 8)
Andreas Brodersen	30	Søborg	Faithful	Winner (Episode 8)
Charlotte Stang	38	Frederiksberg	Faithful	Winner (Episode 8)
Sherica Ashlee Zimmermann Fernand	26	Odense	Faithful	Winner (Episode 8)
