= Forræder - Ukendt Grund 2026 =

- Season 3
- Presented by: Martin Johannes Larsen
- No. of contestants: 19
- Winners: Emil Husth Marling; Kim Oechsle; Mallu Olivia Cortney Damgaard
- Runner-up: Iben Bertelsen
- Location: Hvedholm Castle, Denmark
- No. of episodes: 8

Release
- Original network: TV 2
- Original release: 17 April – 15 June 2026

Season chronology
- ← Previous; 2025 Next → 2027

Forræder - Ukendt Grund 2026 is the third series of the civilian version of Forræder - Ukendt Grund, the Danish adaptation of The Traitors. The season once again returns to Hvedholm Castle in Denmark where 19 Danes compete against each other to try and find and eliminate the traitors from their midst whilst winning a max prize of 250,000kr. For the first time, the season airs on the main TV 2 channel, airing before the celebrity Forræder season. The season is hosted by Martin Johannes Larsen and premiered on 17 April 2026.

== Contestants ==
Notable cast members includes Ask Holmegaard, former contestant on MasterChef Danmark 2026.

List of Forræder - Ukendt Grund 2026 contestants
Contestant	Age	Residence	Affiliation	Finish
Martin Madsen		Svendborg	Faithful	Murdered (Episode 1)
Tina Nyrup Drejer Tilsted		Odense	Faithful	Banished (Episode 1)
Ask Holmegaard	47	Hellerup	Faithful	Murdered (Episode 2)
Nourhan Emnakash		Odense	Faithful	Banished (Episode 2)
Sandra Kirketerp Jensen	30	Rønne	Faithful	Banished (Episode 3)
Lucas Vincenzo Tammaro	24	Copenhagen	Faithful	Murdered (Episode 4)
Benjamin Dupont Igens	30	Egå	Traitor	Banished (Episode 4)
Ronja Leth	36	Odder	Faithful	Banished (Episode 5)
Casper Kirkegaard	21	Grindsted	Faithful	Murdered (Episode 6)
Gabriella Randall	28	Næstved	Faithful	Banished (Episode 6)
Ann Groth Andersen	21	Odense	Faithful	Murdered (Episode 7)
Jakob Kilt Knudsen	25	Aalborg	Faithful	Banished (Episode 7)
Andreas Steffensen		Copenhagen	Faithful	Murdered (Episode 8)
Christina Paris Louise Höfler		Copenhagen	Faithful	Banished (Episode 8)
Gashbin Hagi		Aarhus	Faithful	Banished (Episode 8)
Iben Bertelsen	71	Gilleleje	Faithful	Banished (Episode 8)
Emil Husth Marling	29	Copenhagen	Traitor	Winner (Episode 8)
Kim Oechsle	58	Egå	Traitor (Note: Kim was revealed to be the secret fourth traitor in episode 2.)	Winner (Episode 8)
Mallu Olivia Cortney Damgaard	32	Copenhagen	Traitor	Winner (Episode 8)
