= The Traitors. Zdrajcy 2024 =

- Season 1
- Presented by: Malwina Wędzikowska
- No. of castaways: 24
- Winners: Justyna Kąkol; Stanley Olatunji Ayomo
- Runner-up: Manae Shimizu-Kaczmarczyk
- Location: Mielmont Castle, Jemeppe-sur-Sambre, Belgium
- No. of episodes: 13

Release
- Original network: TVN
- Original release: 28 February – 22 May 2024

Season chronology
- Next → 2025

The Traitors. Zdrajcy 2024 is the first season of the Polish adaptation of The Traitors. The season is hosted by Malwina Wędzikowska where 24 civilians compete for a max prize of 500,000 zł trying to eliminate traitors before the faithfuls are eliminated themselves. The season is filmed at Mielmont Castle in Jemeppe-sur-Sambre, Belgium. The season premiered on 28 February 2024 on TVN and concluded on 22 May 2024 where faithfuls Justyna Kąkol and Stanley Olatunji Ayomo won against fellow faithful Manae Shimizu-Kaczmarczyk to win the final prize of 326,000 zł and be crowned the winners.

== Contestants ==
List of The Traitors. Zdrajcy 2024 contestants
Contestant	Age	Residence	Affiliation	Finish
Bartosz Skrobisz	26	Kraków	Faithful	Murdered (Episode 2)
Monika Kosowska	48	Gdańsk	Traitor	Banished (Episode 2)
Renata Hartle	35	Warsaw	Faithful	Murdered (Episode 3)
Klaudia Piłat	38	Wrocław	Faithful	Banished (Episode 3)
Julia Tychoniewicz	23	Freeport, The Bahamas	Faithful	Murdered (Episode 4)
Robert Trempski	38	Łódź	Faithful	Banished (Episode 4)
Agnieszka Bodziachowska	31	Częstochowa	Faithful	Murdered (Episode 5)
Tadeusz Dębski	73	Warsaw	Faithful	Banished (Episode 5)
Alex Cichosz	24	Warsaw	Traitor	Banished (Episode 6)
Joanna Narojczyk	38	Olsztyn	Faithful	Murdered (Episode 7)
Adam Kossut	35	Warsaw	Faithful	Banished (Episode 7)
Maciej Paszek	30	Szczecin	Faithful	Murdered (Episode 8)
Teo Daeyeong Chung	24	Warsaw	Faithful	Murdered (Episode 9)
Dominika Michałowska	30	Poznań	Traitor	Banished (Episode 9)
Sandra Plajzer	30	Warsaw	Faithful	Murdered (Episode 10)
Mikołaj Jaworski	25	Gdańsk	Faithful	Banished (Episode 10)
Dorota Świętoniowska	60	Olsztyn	Faithful	Banished (Episode 11)
Mikołaj Milcke	42	Warsaw	Faithful	Murdered (Episode 12)
Piotr Sinicki	43	Warsaw	Traitor (Note: Piotr was recruited as a Traitor in episode 9.)	Banished (Episode 12)
Patryk Szczypka	33	Sławków	Faithful	Banished (Episode 13)
Olga Kelm	41	Łódź	Traitor (Note: Olga was recruited as a Traitor in episode 6.)	Banished (Episode 13)
Manae Shimizu-Kaczmarczyk	23	Katowice	Faithful	Banished (Episode 13)
Stanley Olatunji Ayomo	26	Warsaw	Faithful	Winner (Episode 13)
Justyna Kąkol	27	Rzeszów	Faithful	Winner (Episode 13)
