= Die Verräter – Vertraue Niemandem! (season 4) =

- Season 4
- Presented by: Sonja Zietlow
- No. of contestants: 18
- Winners: Ann-Kathrin Bendixen; Peyman Amin
- Runner-up: Nina Meise
- Location: Château de Mielmont, Belgium
- No. of episodes: 8

Release
- Original network: RTL+
- Original release: 3 August – 26 August 2026
- Original release: 17 August – 27 August 2026 (RTL)

Season chronology
- ← Previous; 2025 Next → Season 5

Die Verräter – Vertraue Niemandem! season 4 is the fourth season of the German adaptation of The Traitors. The season is hosted by Sonja Zietlow.

For the first time 18 German celebrities compete against one another to deduce who is faithful and who is a traitor in order to win the grand prize of 50,000 Euros. The season premiered on RTL+ on 3 August 2026 and on RTL on 17 August 2026. This season was again filmed at Château de Mielmont in Belgium. The series concluded on 26 August 2026 on RTL+ and one day later on RTL.

== Contestants ==
List of Die Verräter – Vertraue Niemandem! contestants
Contestant	Age	Notability	Affiliation	Finish
Alexa Maria Surholt	58	Actress	Faithful	Murdered (Episode 1)
Ania Niedieck	43	Actress	Faithful	Banished (Episode 1)
Joelina Drews	30	Singer	Faithful	Murdered (Episode 2)
Marcel Nguyen	39	Artistic gymnast	Faithful	Banished (Episode 2)
Tine Wittler	53	Interior design expert, TV presenter	Faithful	Murdered (Episode 3)
Hardy Krüger Jr.	58	Actor	Faithful	Banished (Episode 3)
Julia Meise	42	Model, Nina's twin	Faithful	Banished (Episode 4)
Papis Loveday	49	Model	Faithful	Murdered (Episode 5)
Philipp Fleiter	40	Podcaster	Faithful	Banished (Episode 5)
Cathy Hummels	38	Entrepreneur, TV presenter	Faithful	Murdered (Episode 6)
Max Kruse	38	Professional footballer	Traitor	Banished (Episode 6)
Gabriel Kelly	25	Singer	Faithful	Banished (Episode 7)
Urs Meier	57	Former football referee	Faithful	Murdered (Episode 8)
Marijke Amado	72	TV presenter	Traitor	Banished (Episode 8)
Ralph Morgenstern	69	Actor, TV presenter	Traitor	Banished (Episode 8)
Nina Meise	42	Model, Julia's twin	Faithful	Runner-up (Episode 8)
Ann-Kathrin Bendixen	26	Influencer	Faithful	Winner (Episode 8)
Peyman Amin	55	Modeling agent	Faithful	Winner (Episode 8)

== Elimination history ==
Key

The contestant was a Faithful.
The contestant was a Traitor.
The contestant was murdered by the Traitors.
The contestant was banished at the round table.
The contestant was ineligible to vote.

Episode	1		2	3	4	5		6	7	8		
Traitors' Decision	Alexa Maria; Cathy; Julia; Nina; Urs	Alexa Maria	Joelina	Tine	Cathy; Nina; Papis; Philipp	Papis (Note: Because Papis lost the Death Match, he was the Murder victim at the start of Episode 5.)		Cathy	Ann-Kathrin; Peyman; Ralph; Urs	Urs		
Traitors' Decision	Shortlist (Note: Because Ania pressed a button in front of the castle before the start of the game, she had to name 5 players to be put on a shortlist for the first murder of the season.)	Murder			Painting of the Damned (Note: Because of Nina & Ralph's decision to choose Banish instead of Murder in Episode 3's second mission, the Traitors weren't allowed to murder that night. Instead later in the episode, the Traitors nominated four players as potential murder victims and wrote it on the Painting of the Damned. Those four players played a Death Match at the end of the episode to determine the Murder victim at the start of Episode 5.)	Murder			Shortlist	Murder		
Shield	Ania (Note: Because Ania pressed a button in front of the castle before the start of the game, she was immune to be murdered on the first night.); Cathy (Note: Because she was the first to be freed from her cage in the first Mission, Cathy was removed from the shortlist and therefore immune from the first murder.)	None	Ralph	None	Ann-Kathrin; Gabriel; Peyman	Nina; Philipp		Gabriel	Gabriel	None		
Shield	Ania; Cathy	None	Ralph	None	Ann-Kathrin; Gabriel; Peyman	Ralph		Gabriel	Ann-Kathrin	None		
Banishment	None	Ania	Marcel	Hardy	Julia	Tie (Note: As Ann-Kathrin and Philipp were tied for the most votes in Round 1. The remaining players could only vote for those two in the revote.)	Philipp	Max	Gabriel	Tie (Note: As Marijke and Nina were tied for the most votes in Round 1. The remaining players could only vote for those two in the revote.)	Tie (Note: Marijke and Nina were still tied for the most votes. The remaining players needed to come a consensus or face another round of voting.)	Marijke
Vote	None	7–4–2–2–1–1	5–2–2–1–1–1–1–1–1	8–4–1	6–5–2	3–3–2–2	5–3	5–4	5–2–1	3–3	2–2	Consensus
Ann-Kathrin	No vote	Max	Philipp	Urs	Urs	Philipp	None (Note: As Ann-Kathrin and Philipp were tied for the most votes in Round 1, she could not vote in the revote.)	Max	Nina	Marijke	Marijke	Marijke
Peyman	No vote	Ania	Marcel	Hardy	Julia	Philipp	Philipp	Marijke	Gabriel	Marijke	Marijke	Marijke
Nina	No vote	Max	Marcel	Hardy	Max	Ann-Kathrin	Ann-Kathrin	Max	Gabriel	Marijke	None (Note: As Marijke and Nina were tied for the most votes in Round 1, she could not vote in the revote.)	None (Note: As Marijke and Nina were tied for the most votes in Round 2, she wasn't eligible for the consensus discussion.)
Ralph	No vote	Peyman	Gabriel	Hardy	Julia	Ann-Kathrin	Ann-Kathrin	Max	Nina	Nina (Note: Ralph used his Dagger. His vote for Nina counted double.)	Nina (Note: Ralph used his Dagger. His vote for Nina counted double.)	Marijke
Marijke	No vote	Gabriel	Marcel	Hardy	Max	Peyman	Philipp	Max	Gabriel	Nina	None (Note: As Marijke and Nina were tied for the most votes in Round 1, she could not vote in the revote.)	None (Note: As Marijke and Nina were tied for the most votes in Round 2, she wasn't eligible for the consensus discussion.)
Urs	No vote	Ania	Marcel	Max	Max	Philipp	Philipp	Max	Gabriel (Note: Urs used his Dagger. His vote for Gabriel counted double.)	Murdered (Episode 8)		
Gabriel	No vote	Ania	Urs	Urs	Urs	Marijke	Philipp	Marijke	Ralph	Banished (Episode 7)		
Max	No vote	Ania	Julia	Urs	Julia	Marijke	Philipp	Marijke (Note: Max used his Dagger. His vote for Marijke counted double.)	Banished (Episode 6)			
Cathy	No vote	Peyman	Urs	Hardy	Julia	Ann-Kathrin	Ann-Kathrin	Murdered (Episode 6)				
Philipp	No vote	Nina	Peyman	Hardy	Julia (Note: Philipp used his Dagger. His vote for Julia counted double.)	Peyman	None (Note: As Ann-Kathrin and Philipp were tied for the most votes in Round 1, he could not vote in the revote.)	Banished (Episode 5)				
Papis	No vote	Ania	Max	Hardy	Max	Murdered (Episode 5)						
Julia	No vote	Ania	Marcel	Hardy	Max	Banished (Episode 4)						
Hardy	No vote	Tine	Philipp	Urs	Banished (Episode 3)							
Tine	No vote	Max	Hardy	Murdered (Episode 3)								
Marcel	No vote	Nina	Nina	Banished (Episode 2)								
Joelina	No vote	Ania	Murdered (Episode 2)									
Ania	No vote	Max	Banished (Episode 1)									
Alexa Maria	No vote	Murdered (Episode 1)										

=== End game ===
Episode	8				
Decision	Banish	Ralph	Banish	Nina	Game Over; Faithfuls Win
Vote	3–1	3–1	2–1	2–1	Game Over; Faithfuls Win
Ann-Kathrin	Banish	Ralph	Banish	Nina	Winners
Peyman	Banish	Ralph	Banish	Nina	Winners
Nina	Banish	Ralph	End Game	Ann-Kathrin	Banished
Ralph	End Game	Nina	Banished		
