= Die Verräter – Vertraue Niemandem! (season 1) =

- Season 1
- Presented by: Sonja Zietlow
- No. of contestants: 16
- Winners: Anna-Carina Woitschack; Vincent Gross
- Runner-up: Mariella Ahrens
- Location: Château de Béguin, France
- No. of episodes: 6

Release
- Original network: RTL
- Original release: 13 September – 11 October 2023

Season chronology
- ← Previous; Season 0 Next → 2024

Die Verräter – Vertraue Niemandem! season 1 is the debut season of the German adaptation of The Traitors. The season is hosted by Sonja Zietlow.

16 German celebrities compete against one another to deduce who is faithful and who is a traitor in order to win the grand prize of 50,000 Euros. The series was filmed on Château de Béguin in France. The series premiered on RTL on 20 September 2023, with the first two episodes premiering on RTL+ on 13 September 2023. The series concluded on 11 October 2023 in streaming and on 25 October 2023 on RTL where Anna-Carina Woitschack and Vincent Gross won as traitors against faithful Mariella Ahrens to win the final grand prize of 46,500 € and were crowned the winners of Die Verräter – Vertraue Niemandem!.

== Contestants ==
List of Die Verräter – Vertraue Niemandem! contestants
Contestant	Age	Notability	Affiliation	Finish
Susan Sideropoulos	42	Actress	Faithful	Murdered (Episode 1)
Sebastian Klussmann	34	Professional quizzer, Chaser on Gefragt – Gejagt	Faithful	Banished (Episode 1)
Timothy Boldt	32	Actor	Faithful	Murdered (Episode 2)
Florian Fitz	55	Actor	Traitor	Banished (Episode 2)
Christine Urspruch	52	Actress	Traitor (Note: Christine started the game as a Faithful but was seduced to be a Traitor in Episode 3.)	Banished (Episode 3)
Shermine Shahrivar	40	Model	Faithful	Murdered (Episode 4)
Jalil	36	Rapper	Traitor	Banished (Episode 4)
Pascal Hens	43	Handball player	Faithful	Murdered (Episode 5)
Ulrike von der Groeben	66	TV presenter	Faithful	Banished (Episode 5)
Claude-Oliver Rudolph	66	Actor	Faithful	Murdered (Episode 6)
Irina Schlauch	32	Reality TV personality	Faithful	Banished (Episode 6)
Sabrina Setlur	49	Rapper	Faithful	Banished (Episode 6)
Friedrich Liechtenstein	67	Actor	Faithful	Banished (Episode 6)
Mariella Ahrens	54	Actress	Faithful	Runner-Up (Episode 6)
Anna-Carina Woitschack	30	Schlager singer	Traitor	Winner (Episode 6)
Vincent Gross	27	Schlager singer	Traitor (Note: Vincent started the game as a Faithful but became a Traitor at the end of Episode 4 following an ultimatum.)	Winner (Episode 6)

== Elimination history ==
Key

The contestant was a Faithful.
The contestant was a Traitor.
The contestant was murdered by the Traitors.
The contestant was banished at the round table.
The contestant was ineligible to vote.

Episode	1	2	3	4		5	6		
Traitors' Decision	Susan	Timothy	Christine	Shermine (Note: Shermine was murdered during the Dinner Party in Episode 4 by a Traitor giving her a "Kiss of Death". This murder was only revealed to the viewers and the other players during the following Breakfast.)	Vincent	Pascal	Claude-Oliver		
Traitors' Decision	Murder		Seduce	Murder	Ultimatum	Murder			
Immune	None		Irina	Friedrich	Friedrich		None (Note: Ulrike received a shield in Episode 5 for the upcoming night, but was then banished in the Round Table preceding it.)		
Banishment	Sebastian	Florian	Christine	Jalil		Ulrike	Irina	Tie	Sabrina
Vote	10–3–1–1	10–3	10–1–1	7–3–1		7–1	3–2–1	2–2–1 (Note: The vote resulted in a tie, the players involved in the tie could not revote.)	2–1
Anna-Carina	Sebastian	Florian	Christine	Jalil		Ulrike	Irina	Sabrina	—N/a (Note: As Anna-Carina was involved in the tie, she could not revote.)
Vincent	Timothy	Florian	Christine	Jalil (Note: Vincent won the dagger in Episode 4, using the double vote on Jalil.)		Ulrike	Friedrich	Sabrina	Sabrina
Mariella	Sebastian	Florian	Christine	Jalil		Ulrike	Irina	Friedrich	Sabrina
Friedrich	Sebastian	Florian	Christine	Irina		Ulrike	Irina	Anna-Carina	Anna-Carina
Sabrina	Sebastian	Florian	Christine	Anna-Carina		Ulrike	Anna-Carina	Anna-Carina	—N/a (Note: As Sabrina was involved in the tie, she could not revote.)
Irina	Sebastian	Florian	Christine	Jalil		Ulrike	Anna-Carina	Banished (Episode 6)	
Claude-Oliver	Sebastian	Irina	Shermine	Jalil		Ulrike	Murdered (Episode 6)		
Ulrike	Timothy	Florian	Christine	Jalil		Irina	Banished (Episode 5)		
Pascal	Florian	Florian	Christine	Anna-Carina		Murdered (Episode 5)			
Jalil	Claude-Oliver	Florian	Christine	Anna-Carina		Banished (Episode 4)			
Shermine	Sebastian	Florian	Christine	Murdered (Episode 4)					
Christine	Sebastian	Irina	Anna-Carina	Banished (Episode 3)					
Florian	Sebastian	Irina	Banished (Episode 2)						
Timothy	Sebastian	Murdered (Episode 2)							
Sebastian	Timothy	Banished (Episode 1)							
Susan	Murdered (Episode 1)								

=== End game ===
Episode	6				
Decision	Banish	Friedrich	Banish	Mariella	Game Over; Traitors Win
Vote	4–0	3–1	1–2	2–1	Game Over; Traitors Win
Anna-Carina	Banish	Friedrich	End Game	Mariella	Winners
Vincent	Banish	Friedrich	End Game	Mariella	Winners
Mariella	Banish	Friedrich	Banish	Anna-Carina	Banished
Friedrich	Banish	Anna-Carina	Banished		
