= The Traitors Srbija =

- Also known as: Traitors Srbija
- Genre: Reality; Game show
- Based on: De Verraders by: Marc Pos; Jasper Hoogendoorn
- Presented by: Jelena Gavrilović
- Composers: Dinesh Wicks; Adam Gock; Anthony Ammar; Rory Chenoweth; Brontë Horder; David Bruggeman
- Country of origin: Serbia
- Original language: Serbian
- No. of seasons: 1

Production
- Production locations: Beli dvor, Belgrade, Serbia
- Camera setup: Multi-camera
- Running time: 60 minutes
- Production company: Rainmaker Production

Original release
- Network: Prva srpska televizija
- Release: 15 September 2026 – present

Related
- International versions

The Traitors Srbija is a Serbian reality competition television series based on the international television format The Traitors. The show is produced for Prva TV by the Belgrade-based production company Rainmaker Production and is hosted by actress Jelena Gavrilović.

Filming took place at the White Palace in Belgrade. The first season began airing on 15 September 2026.

== Format ==
The contestants are divided into two groups: the Faithful and the Traitors. Only the Traitors and the viewers know the Traitors' identities, while the Faithful try to uncover them. The contestants work together to complete challenges and increase the prize fund, while the Traitors secretly select Faithful contestants to be eliminated from the game.

The Faithful try to vote the Traitors out of the competition. If they eliminate all the Traitors by the final stage, the remaining Faithful can win the prize. If any Traitor remains in the game until the end, they can claim the prize fund.

== Production ==
The arrival of The Traitors format in Serbia was announced in February 2026, when Prva TV opened applications for contestants.

The original format was created in the Netherlands under the title De Verraders, produced by IDTV and RTL's creative unit. It first aired on RTL 4 in 2021, while international format distribution rights are held by All3Media International.

Rainmaker Production filmed the first two Serbian seasons consecutively. According to the announced schedule, the first season was set to air in autumn 2026 and the second in spring 2027. Jelena Gavrilović was announced as the show's host on 31 July 2026.

== Season 1 ==
The first season began airing on 15 September 2026, with 20 contestants. Filming took place at the Beli dvor in Belgrade. The maximum prize fund available to the winner or winners of the first season is €50,000.

=== Contestants ===
Contestants of the first season
Contestant	Age and country	Occupation	Affiliation		Finish
Aleksa Negovanović	26, Serbia	Student	Traitor		
Marko Vulević	24, Montenegro	Political scientist	Traitor		
Sanja Berić	35, Serbia	Architect	Traitor		
Ena Cvitičanin	28, Serbia	Dental technician	Faithful		
Ana Marković	29, Serbia	Manicurist	Faithful		Banished (Day 9)
Boris Postovnik	54, Serbia	Opera chorister	None (Days 1 and 2)	Faithful (from Day 3)	Murdered (Night 8)
Nevena Slijepčević	30, Serbia	Model	Faithful		Banished (Day 8)
Biljana Ranković Stow	45, Serbia	Fitness trainer	Faithful		Murdered (Night 7)
Nenad Milošević	36, Serbia	Preschool teacher	Faithful		Banished (Day 7)
Miroslav Radojković	36, Serbia	Security guard	None (Days 1 and 2)	Faithful (from Day 3)	Murdered (Night 6)
Vlada Božilov	31, Serbia	Writer	Faithful		Banished (Day 6)
Ana Mihailović (Anči)	33, Serbia	Make-up artist	Faithful		Banished (Day 5)
Mitar Milićević	25, Serbia	Actor	Faithful		Murdered (Night 4)
Anđela Prodanić	26, Serbia	Student	Faithful		Banished (Day 4)
Uroš Mitrović	27, Serbia	Software developer	Faithful		Murdered (Night 3)
Stefan Stojanović	36, Serbia	Host, slipper maker	Faithful		Banished (Day 3)
Ivana Rakić	51, Serbia	Piano teacher	Faithful		Murdered (Night 2)
Nina Gligorijević	35, Serbia	Economist	Faithful		Banished (Day 2)
Marko Stojanović (Big Marko)	50, Serbia	Football agent	Faithful		Murdered (Night 1)
Predrag Paunović	47, Serbia	Musician	None		Eliminated (Day 1)

=== Gameplay ===
Legend
O The contestant is a Faithful
T The contestant is a Traitor
The contestant was murdered by the Traitors
The contestant was banished at the round table
The contestant was immune from the banishment and subsequent murder
The contestant was eliminated from the game during a challenge

Elimination history
		Days										
		Day 1	Day 2	Day 3	Day 4	Day 5	Day 6	Day 7		Day 8	Day 9	
Traitors' Decision		(Big) Marko	Ivana	Uroš	Mitar	Boris; Ena; Nevena; Miroslav	Miroslav	Ana; Bilja; Ena	Bilja	Boris	Nothing (Note: As only one Faithful remained with 3 Traitors present, the contestants were informed that no murder would happen during the night.)	
Traitors' Decision		Murder	Murder	Murder	Murder	Death row (Note: The Traitors were instructed to compile a list of four contestants, not excluding themselves, and decide which of them would be murdered during Night 6.)	Murder	Public list (Note: After the round table, the Traitors were instructed to compile, within one hour and in the palace in the presence of the other contestants, a list of three contestants, not excluding themselves, and decide which of them would meet them face to face to be murdered during Night 7.)	Face-to-face murder	Murder	Nothing	
Shield (Note: Contestants protected from murder.)		—	Stefan	Boris; Miroslav; Vlada; Biljana	—	—	Ana	Nevena		Ana; Aleksa	—	
Banished		None	Nina	Stefan	Anđela	Anči	Vlada	Nenad		Nevena	Tied	Ana
Vote Contestants		No vote	14–2	6–2–2–1–1–1	10–2–1–1	4–3–3–2	7–2–1–1	4–2–1–1–1		4–2–1	3–3	2–1
T	Aleksa		Nina	Stefan	Vlada	Biljana	Vlada	Marko		Nevena	Ana	Ana
T	Marko		Nina	Anđela	Anđela	Ena	Miroslav	Nenad		Nevena	Ana	Ineligible to vote
T	Sanja		Nina	Nenad	Anđela	Anči	Vlada	Aleksa		Nevena	Ana	Ana
F	Ena		Nina	Biljana	Nevena	Biljana	Vlada	Nenad		Nevena	Marko	Marko
F	Ana		Nina	Sanja	Anđela	Anči	Marko	Bilja		Sanja	Marko ⋅ 2 (Note: Ana earned a dagger during the challenge, so her vote at the round table counted twice.)	Ineligible to vote
F	Boris (Note: Predrag, Boris and Miroslav were eliminated before entering the palace. After a vote by the contestants on Day 3, Boris and Miroslav returned to the game, while Predrag was burned at the stake.)	Eliminated		Ineligible to vote	Anđela	Vlada	Vlada	Sanja		Ena	Murdered (Night 8)	
F	Nevena		Nina	Sanja	Anđela	Ena	Vlada	Nenad		Sanja	Banished (Day 8)	
F	Biljana		Nina	Anđela	Anđela	Anči	Aleksa	Nenad		Murdered (Night 7)		
F	Nenad		Nina	Stefan	Anđela	Biljana	Vlada	Marko		Banished (Day 7)		
F	Miroslav	Eliminated		Ineligible to vote	Anđela	Vlada	Vlada	Murdered (Night 6)				
F	Vlada		Nina	Stefan	Ena	Anči	Marko	Banished (Day 6)				
F	Anči		Nina	Stefan	Anđela	Vlada	Banished (Day 5)					
F	Mitar		Nina	Stefan	Anđela	Murdered (Night 4)						
F	Anđela		Nina	Ana	Ena	Banished (Day 4)						
F	Uroš		Vlada	Stefan	Murdered (Night 3)							
F	Stefan		Nina	Mitar	Banished (Day 3)							
F	Ivana		Nina	Murdered (Night 2)								
F	Nina		Vlada	Banished (Day 2)								
F	(Big) Marko		Murdered (Night 1)									
Predrag		Eliminated										
