= Marie Staal =

Norwegian-Danish stage actress (1806–1871)

Marie Staal (11 November 1806 - 16 February 1871 ) was a Norwegian-Danish stage actress.

Mette Marie Staal was born in Faaborg, Denmark. She was the daughter of Hans Mathiasen and Mette Mortensdatter. In 1828, she was married to Ditlev Christian Henrich Staal (1802-1859).

She was engaged in travelling theatre companies in Drammen and Bergen in 1827-1837 until she was engaged at the Christiania Theatre in 1837, where she became a leading lady within the female main parts in the plays by Ludvig Holberg during the 1840s and 1850s.
