= Die Verräter – Vertraue Niemandem! (season 3) =

- Season 3
- Presented by: Sonja Zietlow
- No. of contestants: 16
- Winners: Charlotte Würdig; Mirja du Mont; Motsi Mabuse
- Runner-up: Younes Zarou
- Location: Château de Mielmont, Belgium
- No. of episodes: 6

Release
- Original network: RTL; RTL+
- Original release: 29 April – 2 June 2025

Season chronology
- ← Previous; 2024 Next → 2026

Die Verräter – Vertraue Niemandem! season 3 is the third season of the German adaptation of The Traitors. The season is hosted by Sonja Zietlow.

16 German celebrities compete against one another to deduce who is faithful and who is a traitor in order to win the grand prize of 50,000 Euros. The season premiered on RTL and RTL+] on 29 April 2025. This season was again filmed at Château de Mielmont in Belgium. The series concluded on 2 June 2025 where Charlotte Würdig, Mirja du Mont and Motsi Mabuse won as traitors after voting out the final Faithful Younes Zarou to win the final grand prize of 44,200 € and were crowned the winners of Die Verräter – Vertraue Niemandem! season 3.

== Contestants ==
List of Die Verräter – Vertraue Niemandem! contestants
Contestant	Age	Notability	Affiliation	Finish
Timon Krause	30	Magic artist	Faithful	Murdered (Episode 1)
Jorge González	57	Choreographer, model	Faithful	Banished (Episode 1)
Sandy Mölling	43	Singer	Faithful	Murdered (Episode 2)
Jan Hofer	75	Newsreader, TV presenter	Faithful	Banished (Episode 2)
Martina Voss-Tecklenburg	57	Former football player and coach	Faithful	Murdered (Episode 3)
Janin Ullmann	43	Actress, TV presenter	Faithful	Banished (Episode 3)
Joachim Llambi	60	Dancer, judge, TV presenter	Faithful	Murdered (Episode 4)
Wayne Carpendale	48	Actor, TV presenter	Traitor	Banished (Episode 4)
Thaddäus Meilinger	43	Actor	Faithful	Banished (Episode 5)
Ralf Bauer	58	Actor	Faithful	Murdered (Episode 6)
Joe Laschet	36	Son of Armin Laschet, model, influencer	Faithful	Banished (Episode 6)
Marie Reim	25	Schlager singer	Faithful	Banished (Episode 6)
Younes Zarou	27	Web video producer, digital content creator, influencer	Faithful	Runner-up (Episode 6)
Charlotte Würdig	46	TV presenter, actress	Traitor	Winner (Episode 6)
Mirja du Mont	49	Actress, model	Traitor	Winner (Episode 6)
Motsi Mabuse	43	Dancer, dancing coach, judge	Traitor	Winner (Episode 6)

== Elimination history ==
Key

The contestant was a Faithful.
The contestant was a Traitor.
The contestant was murdered by the Traitors.
The contestant was banished at the round table.
The contestant was ineligible to vote.

Episode	1	2	3	4	5	6	
Traitors' Decision	Timon	Sandy	Martina	Joachim	Marie; Ralf; Thaddäus	Ralf	
Traitors' Decision	Murder				Shortlist	Murder	
Immune	Joachim; Marie	None	Motsi	Charlotte	Younes		
Banishment	Jorge	Jan	Janin	Wayne	Thaddäus	Joe	Marie
Vote	8–4–2–1	6–4–1–1–1	8–2–1	7–1–1–1	8–1	5–1	3–2
Charlotte	Jorge	Jan	Janin	Wayne	Thaddäus	Joe	Marie
Mirja	Jorge	Janin	Janin (Note: Mirja used a Dagger, doubling her vote for Wayne.)	Wayne	Thaddäus	Joe	Marie
Motsi	Jorge	Jan	Janin	Wayne	Thaddäus	Joe	Marie
Younes	Janin	Jan	Janin	Wayne	Thaddäus	Joe	Charlotte
Marie	Jorge	Janin	Janin	Wayne	Thaddäus	Joe	Charlotte
Joe	Marie	Jan	Janin	Thaddäus	Thaddäus (Note: Joe used a Dagger, doubling his vote for Thaddäus.)	Marie	Banished (Episode 6)
Ralf	Marie	Jan	Janin	Wayne	Thaddäus	Murdered (Episode 6)	
Thaddäus	Jorge	Janin	Wayne	Joe	Joe	Banished (Episode 5)	
Wayne	Jorge	Marie	Joachim	Motsi	Banished (Episode 4)		
Joachim	Janin	Jan	Janin	Murdered (Episode 4)			
Janin	Jorge	Jan	Wayne	Banished (Episode 3)			
Martina	Marie	Wayne	Murdered (Episode 3)				
Jan	Jorge	Joe	Banished (Episode 2)				
Sandy	Marie	Murdered (Episode 2)					
Jorge	Thaddäus	Banished (Episode 1)					
Timon	Murdered (Episode 1)						

=== End game ===
Episode	8			
Decision	Banish	Younes	End Game	Game Over; Traitors Win
Vote	2–2	3–1	3–0	Game Over; Traitors Win
Charlotte	End Game	Younes	End Game	Winners
Mirja	Banish	Younes	End Game	Winners
Motsi	End Game	Younes	End Game	Winners
Younes	Banish	Charlotte	Banished	
