= Konstantinos Markoulakis =

Greek actor

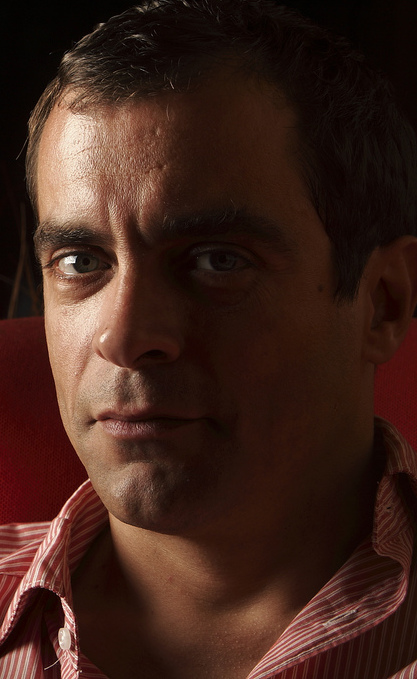
- Born: 24 July 1970 (age 55); Athens, Greece
- Other name: Markos Markoulakis
- Occupation: Actor
- Years active: 1991–present
- Children: Giorgos Ikaros Markoulakis (June 3rd 2005)

Konstantinos Markoulakis (also known as Constantine Markoulakis, born 1970 in Athens) is a Greek director and actor.

== Education and Career ==
He graduated from Athens College and he studied in Dramatic School of National Theatre. Since 1991, he has been working continuously in theatre, cinema and television. He has played in successful TV-series and he has won a television award for the TV-series Etsi Xafnika, in 2005. He has also won an Odysseas Award in 2013 London Greek Festival for the film The Telemachy. Markoulakis is active in politics and he was candidate with Drassi.

== Selected filmography ==
=== Cinema ===
- Rizoto (2000)
- Mia yperohi mera (2003)
- Hardcore (2004)
- Epikindynes mageirikes (2010)
- The Telemachy (2012)

=== TV-series ===
==== Actor ====
- Logo Timis (1996)
- I Zoi pou den Ezisa (1998)
- Na me proseheis (2000)
- Ax kai na kseres (2002)
- Etsi Xafnika (2004)
- Yungermann (2008)
- Ethniki Ellados (2015)
- Ο Doctor (2023)

==== TV Presenter ====
- Survivor Greece (2006)
- Oi Prodotes (2023)

== Filmography ==
=== Television ===
Year	Title	Role(s)	Notes
1991-1992	Sacrifice	Ion	Main role, 18 episodes
1992-1993	Women	Konstantinos	5 episodes
1994	Anatomy of a crime		Episode: "Mask"
1994-1995	Red Moon	Stefanos Roukounas	Lead role, 16 episodes
1995	Anatomy of a crime		Episode: "Fallen angel"
1995-1996	The third marriage	Dimitris Loggos	Lead role, 11 episodes
1996	The professionals	Themis	Lead role, 13 episodes
1996-1997	A Word of Honor	Michalis Andreadis	Lead role, 31 episodes
1998-1999	A life I never lived	Socrates	Lead role, 20 episodes
2000-2001	Take care of me	Konstantinos	Lead role, 24 episodes
2002	Red Cycle	Lefteris Mavrelos	Episode: "The robber"
2002	Red Cycle	transport company worker #1	Episode: "Trojan War"
2002-2003	Oh, if only you knew	Antonis Katsaros	Lead role, 26 episodes
2003	Close the eyes		1 episode
2004-2005	So Suddenly	Andreas	Lead role, 20 episodes
2005-2006	Earth and sky	Fanis	Lead role, 30 episodes
2006	Survivor Greece: Greece VS Turkey	Himself (host)	Season 3
2007	The stories of detective Bekas	Harris Despiris	Episode: "Crime in Hydra"
2007-2008	Yungermann	Vassilie Karlovich Yungermann	Lead role, 15 episodes (5 unaired)
2008-2009	Power of 10	Himself (host)	Saturday game show
2009	Talk Dirty to Me	The God	Voice role, 5 episodes
2009	Mega Friday All-Nighters	boss	Episode: "Julienne & Amandine"
2010	You cannot take something from someone who doesn't have	William Shakespeare	Voice role, 1 episode
2011-2012	Premiere		Lead role, 28 episodes
2015	National Team	Dionysis Raptopoulos	1 episode
2019	A Word of Honor - 20 Years Later	Michalis Andreadis	Lead role, 12 episodes
2019-2020	The Other Me - The Series	Ilias Velissaratos	Lead role, 16 episodes; season 1-2
2023	The Traitors Greece	Himself (host)	Season 1
2023-2026	The Doctor	Andreas Vrettos	Lead role, 46 episodes
2025-2026	The judge	Petros Dimitriou	Lead role, 60 episodes
2026	Out of plan with Konstantinos Markoulakis	Himself (host)	Upcoming variety show
