= Logo timis =

- Genre: Sociable; Juvenile
- Written by: Mirella Papaoikonomou
- Directed by: Lampis Zaroutiadis
- Starring: Alkis Kourkoulos; Viky Volioti; Konstantinos Markoulakis; Christina Alexanian; Giorgos Pyrpasopoulos; Aggeliki Dimitrakopoulou
- Theme music composer: Dimitris Papadimitriou
- Opening theme: Chroma den allazoun ta matia by Gerasimos Andreatos
- Country of origin: Greece
- Original language: Greek
- No. of seasons: 2
- No. of episodes: 43

Production
- Executive producers: ANOSI Α.Ε. Black Orange Productions
- Production locations: Patras, Greece; Athens, Greece
- Running time: 42-45 minutes

Original release
- Network: Mega Channel
- Release: 30 September 1996 – 26 May 1997
- Network: Skai TV
- Release: 23 September – 12 December 2019

Logo timis (English: A Word of Honor) is a Greek social and youth television series produced in 1996-1997 that was originally broadcast by Mega Channel, while in the 2019-2020 season, the remake of the series was broadcast by SKAI.

== Series overview ==
Season	Episodes	Originally aired	
Season	Episodes	First aired	Last aired
1	31	September 30, 1996	May 26, 1997
2	12	September 23, 2019	December 12, 2019

== Plot ==
A group of friends, just before taking national exams, experience the anxieties about their future while living the present intensely. "A Word of Honor" is the promise that the children of the group make to each other that they will stay together no matter what happens. Their existential problems, their love relationships, conflicts with their parents, their dreams for tomorrow. The results are announced. Some get through to universities! Some don't... However, they all move to Athens, leaving the Achaean capital and their families behind.

In an era with intense social problems and a lack of values, the young people begin their personal struggle to stand on their own two feet. They struggle to raise their stature, to plan their future, to stay unscathed. In a society that does nothing but stifle their vital forces, "A Word of Honor" is a glimpse of optimism for young people who have the strength and courage to resist.

== Cast ==
- Alkis Kourkoulos as Manos
- Viky Volioti as Iro
- Konstantinos Markoulakis as Michalis
- Christina Alexanian as Mania
- Giorgos Pyrpasopoulos as Aris
- Aggeliki Dimitrakopoulou as Athena
