= Die Verräter – Vertraue Niemandem! (season 2) =

- Season 2
- Presented by: Sonja Zietlow
- No. of contestants: 16
- Winners: Jessica Haller; Oana Nechiti
- Runner-up: Marina Hoermanseder
- Location: Château de Mielmont, Belgium
- No. of episodes: 8

Release
- Original network: RTL (premiere); RTL+
- Original release: 10 October – 24 November 2024

Season chronology
- ← Previous; 2023 Next → 2025

Die Verräter – Vertraue Niemandem! season 2 is the second season of the German adaptation of The Traitors. The season is hosted by Sonja Zietlow.

16 German celebrities compete against one another to deduce who is faithful and who is a traitor in order to win the grand prize of 50,000 Euros. The season premiered on RTL and RTL+] on 10 October 2024, with the remaining episodes being aired on RTL+. This season was Halloween-themed and was filmed at Château de Mielmont in Belgium. As a twist, Susan Sideropoulos, who was the first murder victim in season 1, was brought back to play the game a second time. The series concluded on 24 November 2024 where Jessica Haller and Oana Nechiti won as traitors after voting out fellow traitor Marina Hoermanseder to win the final grand prize of 27,500 € and were crowned the winners of Die Verräter – Vertraue Niemandem!.

== Contestants ==
List of Die Verräter – Vertraue Niemandem! contestants
Contestant	Age	Notability	Affiliation	Finish
Oliver Korittke	56	Actor	Faithful	Murdered (Episode 1)
Gerda Lewis	31	Model, Reality TV personality	Traitor	Banished (Episode 2)
Massimo Sinató	42	Dancer	Faithful	Murdered (Episode 3)
Helge Mark Lodder	30	Actor, TikTok creator	Faithful	Banished (Episode 3)
Thomas Drechsel	37	Actor	Faithful	Banished (Episode 4)
Gülcan Kamps	42	TV presenter	Faithful	Murdered (Episode 5)
Philipp Boy	37	Artistic gymnast	Faithful	Banished (Episode 5)
Kevin Kuske	45	Bobsledder	Faithful	Murdered (Episode 6)
Susan Sideropoulos	43	Actress	Faithful	Banished (Episode 7)
Jan Sosniok	56	Actor	Faithful	Banished (Episode 7)
Dana Schweiger	56	Entrepreneur, TV host	Faithful	Murdered (Episode 8)
Bruce Darnell	67	Choreographer, model	Faithful	Banished (Episode 8)
Jimi Blue Ochsenknecht	32	Actor, rapper	Faithful	Banished (Episode 8)
Marina Hoermanseder	38	Fashion designer	Traitor	Runner-Up (Episode 8)
Jessica Haller	34	Reality TV personality	Traitor (Note: Jessica started the game as a Faithful but became a Traitor at the end of Episode 1.)	Winner (Episode 8)
Oana Nechiti	36	Dancer, choreographer	Traitor	Winner (Episode 8)

== Elimination history ==
Key

The contestant was a Faithful.
The contestant was a Traitor.
The contestant was murdered by the Traitors.
The contestant was banished at the round table.
The contestant was ineligible to vote.

Episode	1		2	3	4	5	6			7		8
Traitors' Decision	Oliver	Jessica	None	Massimo	Gülcan; Philipp; Susan; Thomas	Gülcan	Kevin				None (Note: Since the group unanimously voted for a Banishment in Episode 6, no Murder occurred the following night.)	Dana
Traitors' Decision	Murder	Recruitment	None	Murder	Shortlist	Murder	Murder				None	Murder
Immune	None			Helge	Jimi	Philipp (Note: Since the group carried Philipp's coffin over the finish line in Episode 4's mission, Philipp was removed from the shortlist and could be murdered at the start of Episode 5.)	Jimi			Jimi		
Banishment	None		Gerda	Helge	Thomas	Philipp	Banish (Note: The group voted for either a Banishment or a Murder to happen next. If the group unanimously for a Banishment, no Murder would occur the following night.)	Tie	Tie	Susan	Jan	Bruce
Vote	None		9–3–1–1–1	8–2–1–1–1	4–3–2–2–1–1	3–2–1–1–1–1–1	8–0	3–3–2 (Note: The first vote resulted in a tie, so the players involved in the tie could not revote.)	3–3–2 (Note: The revote also resulted in a tie. Per the rules, a re-revote occurred and the players involved in the tie were immune from Banishment.)	3–2–2–1	3–2–2–1	3–2–1
Jessica	No vote		Gerda	Helge	Jan	Dana	Banish	Jan	No vote (Note: Since Jessica was involved in the tie, she could not revote.)	Marina	Jan	Bruce
Oana	No vote		Gerda	Helge	Thomas	Susan	Banish	Jan	No vote (Note: Since Oana was involved in the tie, she could not revote.)	Jan	Jan	Bruce
Marina	No vote		Gerda	Bruce	Thomas	Philipp	Banish	Jessica	Jessica	Susan	Jan	Bruce
Jimi	No vote		Helge	Dana	Thomas	Jan	Banish	Oana	Oana	Dana	Jessica (Note: Jimi used a Dagger, doubling his vote for Jessica.)	Jessica (Note: Jimi used a Dagger, doubling his vote for Jessica.)
Bruce	No vote		Helge	Jimi	Susan	Philipp	Banish	Oana	Oana	Marina	Marina	Oana
Dana	No vote		Gerda	Helga	Jessica	Jessica	Banish	Jessica	Jessica	Susan	Bruce	Murdered (Episode 8)
Jan	No vote		Bruce	Helge	Jessica	Oana	Banish	Oana	Oana	Susan	Bruce	Banished (Episode 7)
Susan	No vote		Gerda	Helge	Dana	Philipp	Banish	Jessica	Jessica	Jan	Banished (Episode 7)	
Kevin	No vote		Gerda	Helge	Dana	Marina	Murdered (Episode 6)					
Philipp	No vote		Helge	Helge	Thomas	Jessica	Banished (Episode 5)					
Gülcan	No vote		Gerda	Helge	Philipp	Murdered (Episode 5)						
Thomas	No vote		Gerda	Philipp	Philipp (Note: Thomas used a Dagger, doubling his vote for Philipp.)	Banished (Episode 4)						
Helge	No vote		Kevin	Jimi	Banished (Episode 3)							
Massimo	No vote		Gerda	Murdered (Episode 3)								
Gerda	No vote		Dana	Banished (Episode 2)								
Oliver	Murdered (Episode 1)											

=== End game ===
Episode	8				
Decision	Banish	Jimi	Banish	Marina	Game Over; Traitors Win
Vote	4–0	3–1	2–1	2–1	Game Over; Traitors Win
Jessica	Banish	Jimi	Banish	Marina	Winners
Oana	Banish	Jimi	Banish	Marina	Winners
Marina	Banish	Jimi	End Game	Jessica	Banished
Jimi	Banish	Marina	Banished		
