= Bjørnø =

Island in Denmark

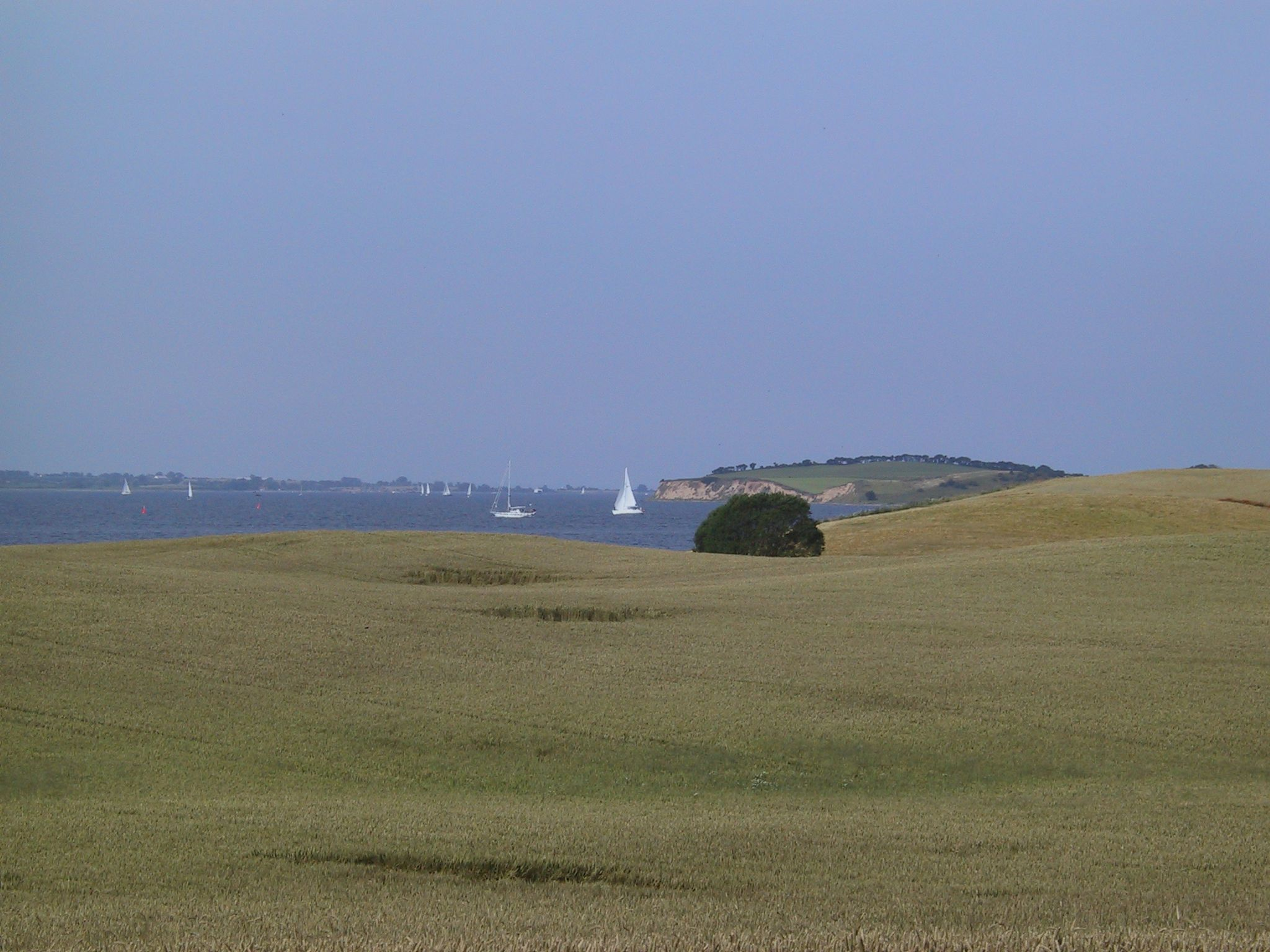
- View over Bjørnø towards Faaborg

- Location of Bjørnø in Denmark and in the Region of South Denmark. Bjørnø (Region of Southern Denmark)

Geography
- Location: Baltic Sea
- Coordinates: 55°04′N 10°15′E
- Archipelago: South Funen Archipelago
- Area: 1.5 km^{2} (0.58 sq mi)

Administration
- Denmark
- Region: Region of South Denmark
- Municipality: Faaborg-Midtfyn Municipality

Demographics
- Demonym: Bjørnøbo
- Population: 32 (2024)

Additional information
- Time zone: CET (UTC+1)
  - Summer (DST): CEST (UTC+2)
- Official website: www.xn--bjrn-hrac.info

Bjørnø is a Danish island south of Funen. The island covers an area of 1.5 km^{2} and has 32 inhabitants. The island can be reached by ferry from Faaborg.
