= Reeturid =

Estonian reality television series

- Season 1
- Presented by: Urmas Vaino
- No. of castaways: 20
- Location: Alatskivi Castle, Estonia
- No. of episodes: 10

Release
- Original network: Kanal 2
- Original release: 27 September 2026 – present

Reeturid (The Traitors) is the Estonian version of the reality television franchise The Traitors. 20 Estonians, a mix of celebrities and civilians where they go to Alatskivi Castle in Estonia where they are divided into two teams, the faithfuls and the traitors where the latter try to eliminate the others to take the grand prize of up to €25,000 at the end of the game. The series is hosted by Urmas Vaino and premiered on Kanal 2 on 27 September 2026.

== Contestants ==
List of Reeturid contestants
Contestant	Age	Residence	Occupation/Notability	Affiliation	Finish
Mats Mikkor	31	Tartu	Scientist	Faithful	Murdered (Episode 2)
Kristo Tomingas	48	Viimsi	Bartender	Faithful	Banished (Episode 2)
Maarja Punak	41	Tartu	Police Officer	Faithful	Murdered (Episode 3)
Margaret Petrova	28	Tallinn	Journalist	Faithful	Banished (Episode 3)
Liis Haab	38	Tallinn	Actress	Faithful	Murdered (Episode 4)
Peep Vain	58	Tallinn	Teacher	Traitor	Banished (Episode 4)
Birgit Kermes	46	Tallinn	Neurotrainer	Faithful	Murdered (Episode 5)
Charlotta Rebecca Zobel	28	Tallinn	Sworn advocate	Traitor	Banished (Episode 5)
Aleksander Eeri Laupmaa	32	Tallinn	Comedian	Faithful	Murdered (Episode 6)
Richard Samarüütel	34	Tallinn	Magician	Faithful	Banished (Episode 6)
Vootele Päi	37	Tallinn	Strategist	Faithful	Banished (Episode 7)
Mihkel Raud	57	Pärnu	Writer, Actor & TV Judge	Faithful	Murdered (Episode 8)
Ingmar Jõela	36	Tallinn	Director-Choreographer	Faithful	Banished (Episode 8)
Anželika Ruubel	46	Tallinn	HR Manager	Faithful	
Jevgeni Kolikov	37	Tallinn	MasterChef Eesti: Professionaalid	Faithful	
Kadri Tali	53	Tallinn	Music Manager	Faithful	
Kelli-Karita Jefimov	27	Tallinn	Hairstylist	Traitor	
Kirsti Valdstein-Timmer	54	Tallinn	Clairvoyant & Radio Host	Traitor (Note: Kirsti started the game as a Faithful but became a Traitor in Episode 6 following an ultimatum.)	
Kristjan Laas	37	Tallinn	Eesti otsib superstaari	Faithful	
Kätlin Kontor-Kirss	47	Tallinn	Screenwriter & Producer	Faithful	
