= Carl Dahl (artist) =

Danish marine painter (1812–1865)

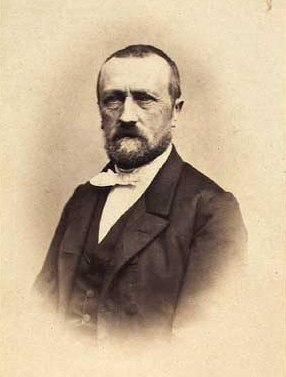
Carl Dahl

Niels Carl Michaelius (Michael) Flindt Dahl, usually known as Carl Dahl, (24 March 1812 in Faaborg – 7 April 1865 in Frederiksberg) was a Danish marine painter during the Golden Age of Danish Painting.

== Biography ==
In 1835, Dahl entered the Danish Academy where he ultimately specialized in marine painting under Christoffer Wilhelm Eckersberg who took him to Langelinie where he was able to paint frigates and liners in their natural environment. In addition to a study tour of Italy and the Mediterranean, he travelled to Lisbon (1840), Germany and France (1852 and 1855), Norway (1861) and to London and the Faroe Islands (1862). As a result of his interest in marine painting, he became one of Eckersberg's closest friends in the 1840s as they helped each other to complete their paintings.

In 1849, he won the Neuhausen prize for his Skibe, der ere passerede Kronborg (Ships passing Kronborg). Despite his mastery of perspective, he lacked the freedom of artistic expression which would have contributed to the value of his paintings. His most important work is considered to be Søtræfningen ved Helgoland (Battle at sea near Heligoland) now in Frederiksberg Museum. Other notable works include Parti fra Larsens Plads ved havnen i København (Larsen Square near Copenhagen Harbor, c. 1840), Lissabons rhed (Roadstead of Lisboa, 1843) and Fregat i en storm med rebede undersejl (A Frigate in Rough Sea).

== Gallery ==
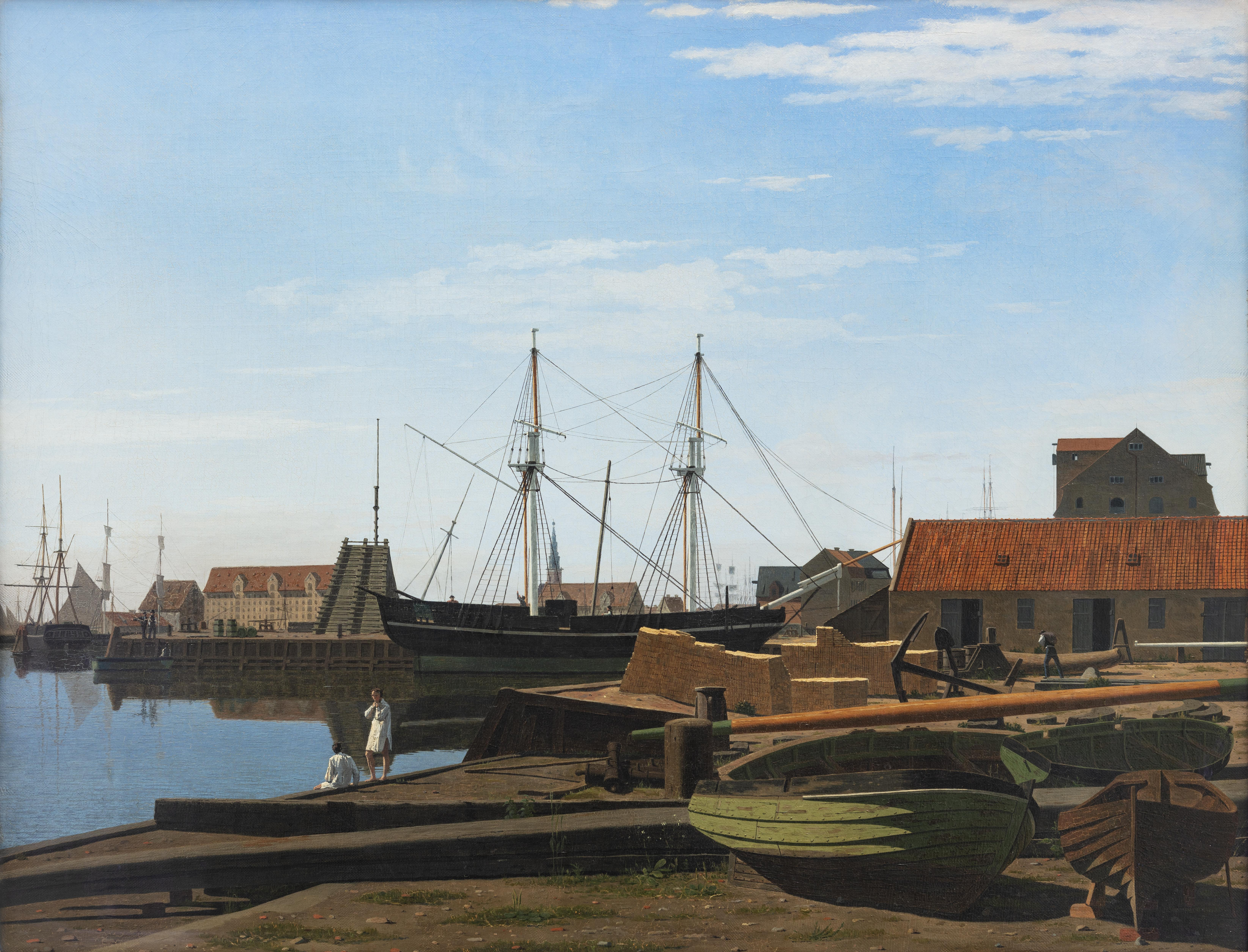
Larsen Square near Copenhagen Harbor (1840)

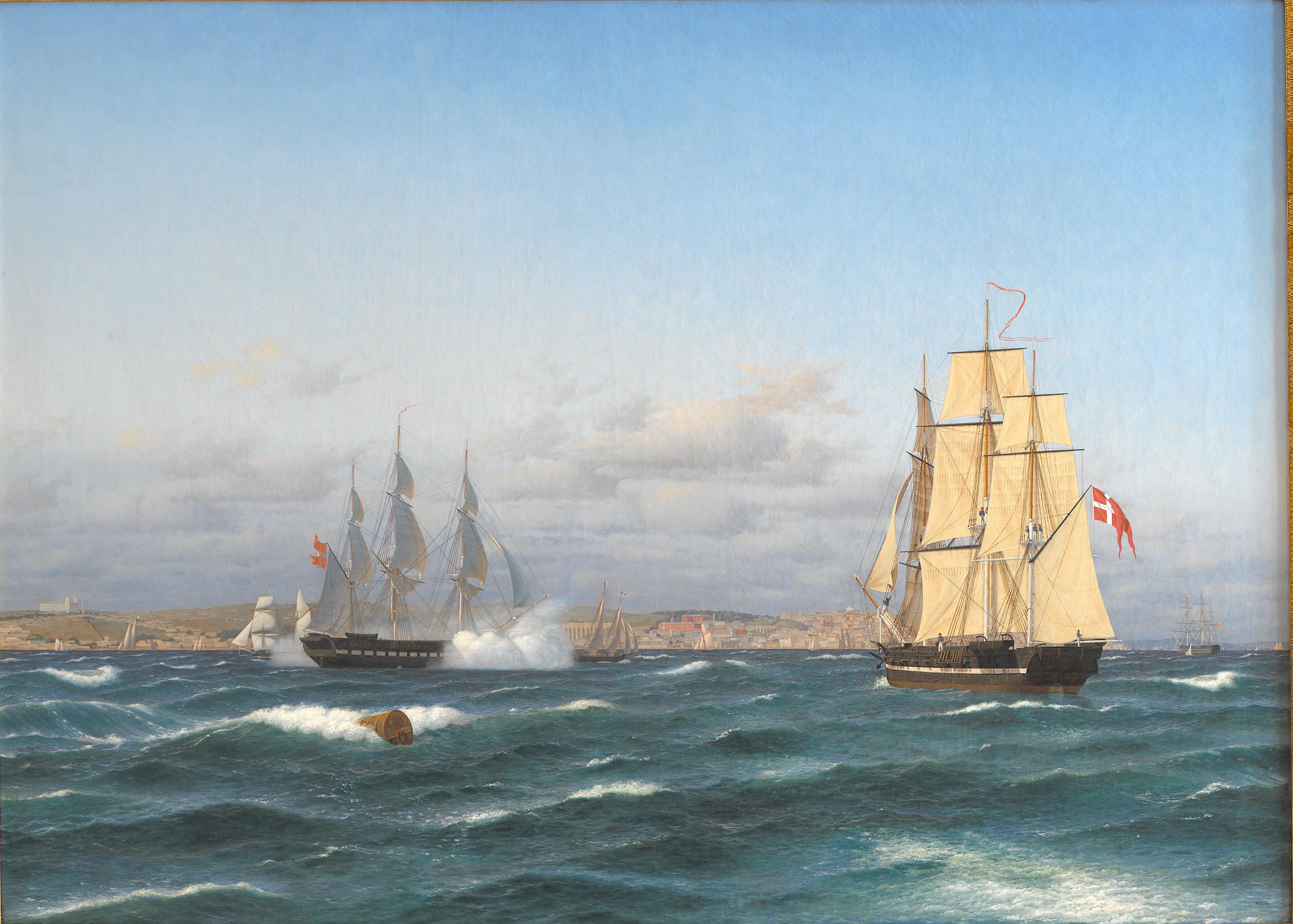
Lissabons rhed (1843)

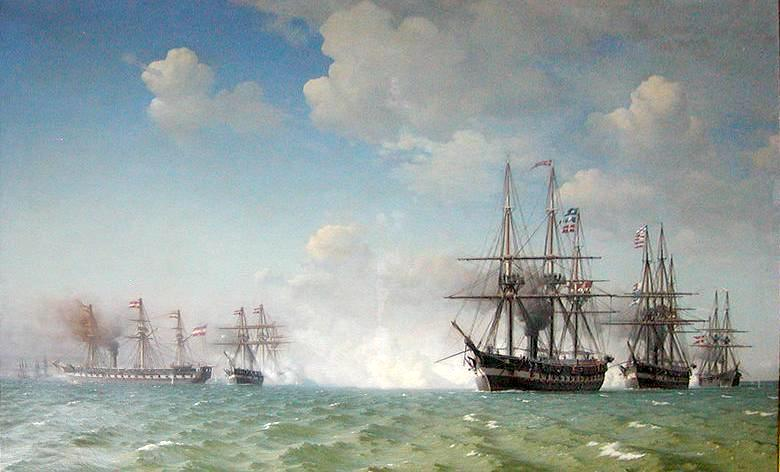
Søtræfningen ved Helgoland (1864)

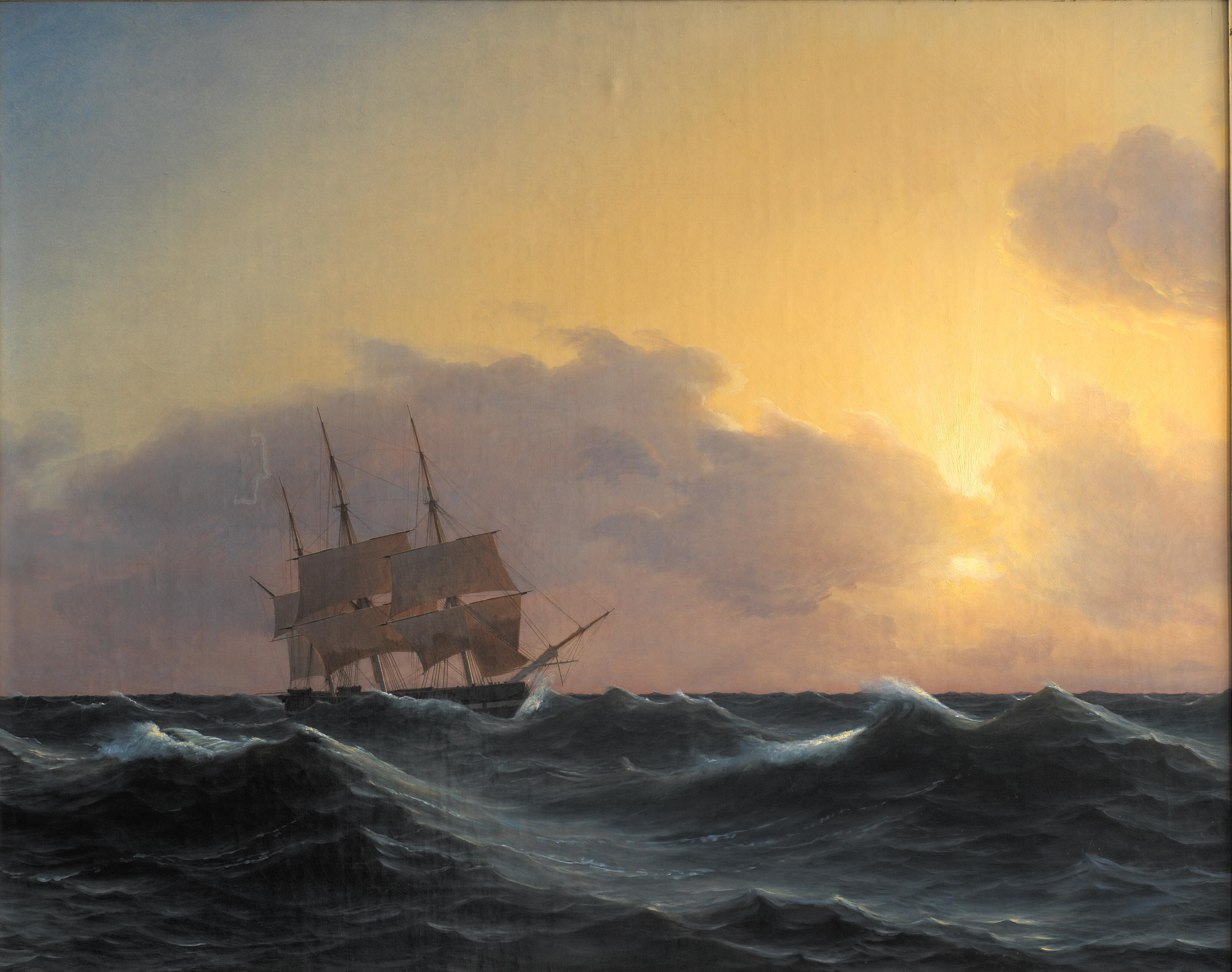
Fregat i en storm med rebede undersejl (1846)
