= Faaborg =

- Town
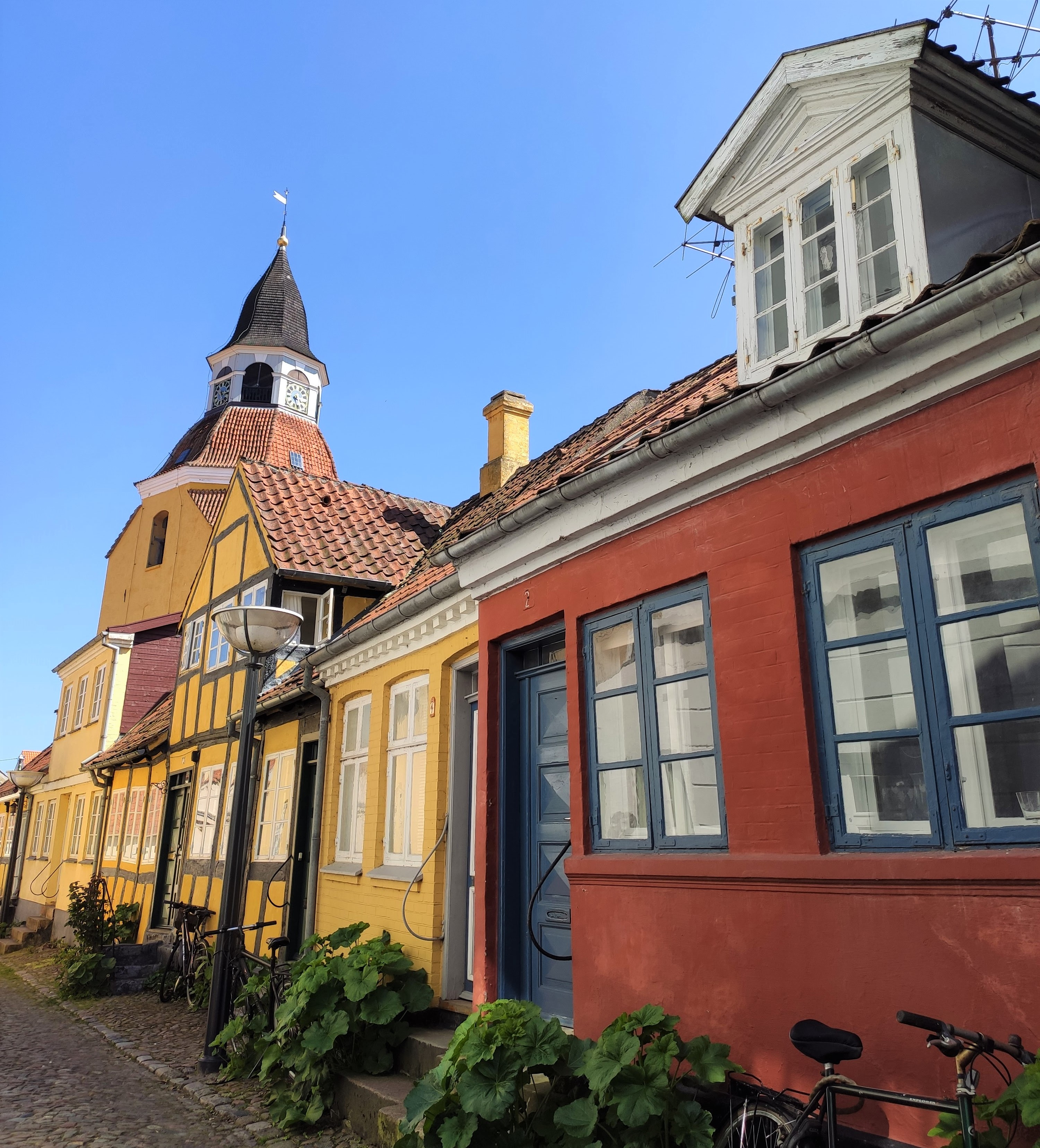
- Tower Street in Faaborg

- Coat of arms

- Location in Denmark Faaborg (Region of Southern Denmark)
- Coordinates: 55°06′N 10°14′E
- Country: Denmark
- Region: Southern Denmark
- Municipality: Faaborg-Midtfyn

Area
  - Urban: 4.6 km^{2} (1.8 sq mi)

Population (2026)
  - Urban: 6,822
  - Urban density: 1,500/km^{2} (3,800/sq mi)
  - Gender: 3,242 males and 3,580 females
- Time zone: UTC+1 (CET)
  - Summer (DST): UTC+2 (CEST)
- Postal code: DK-5600 Faaborg

Faaborg or Fåborg (Danish: [ˈfʌˌpɒˀ]) is an old port town located on Faaborg Fjord in Faaborg-Midtfyn municipality on the island of Funen in Denmark. By road, Faaborg is located 42 kilometres (26 mi) southwest of Odense, 27 kilometres (17 mi) west-northwest of Svendborg, and roughly 70 kilometres (43 mi) southeast of Middelfart, depending upon the route. It has a population of 6,822 (1 January 2026). With its busy port, narrow streets and attractive old houses, the town is popular with tourists, particularly in the summer months. Faaborg was formerly the seat of Faaborg municipality. The seat of the new municipality is Ringe. Both municipalities use(d) Faaborg's medieval coat of arms.

== History ==
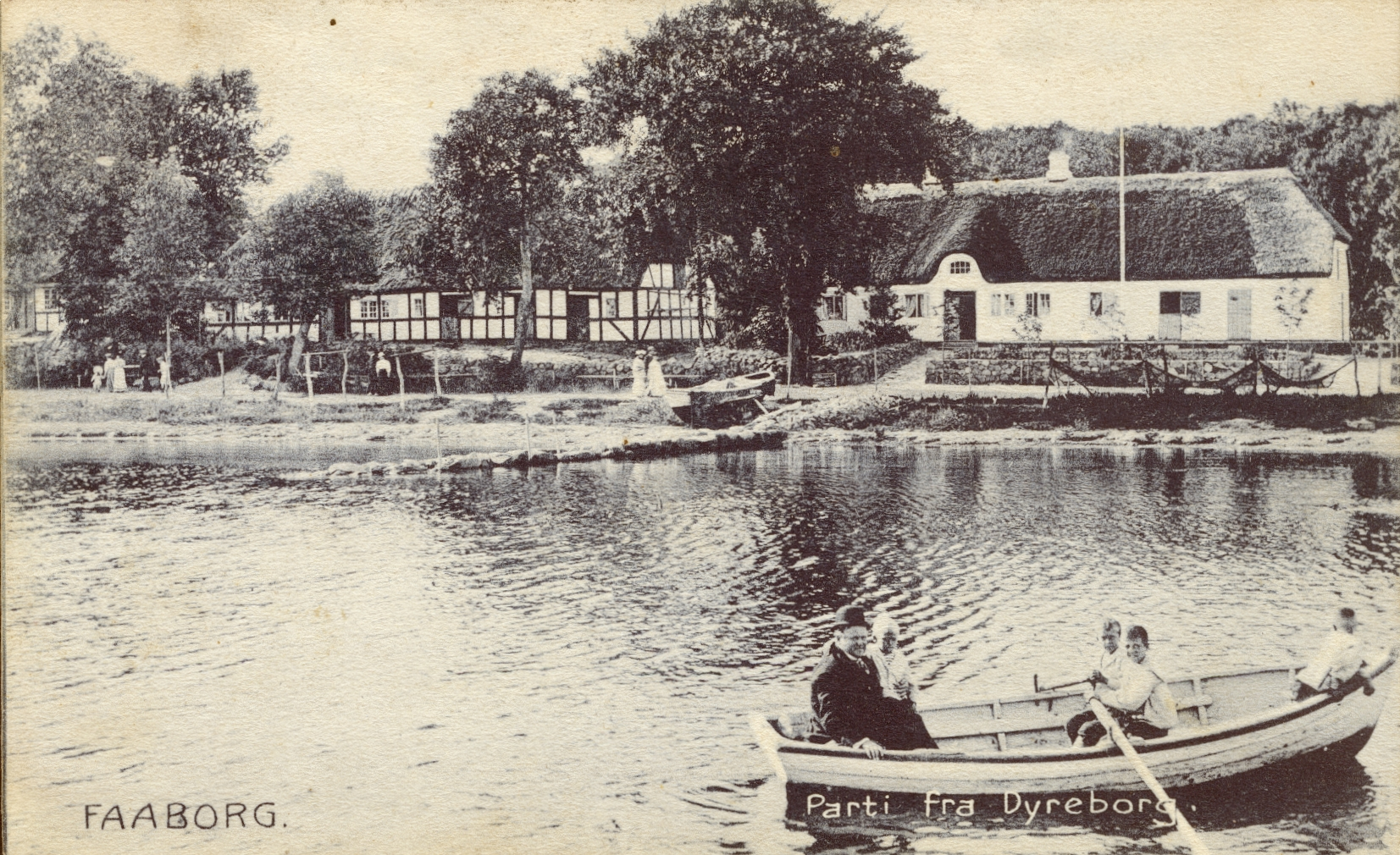
Dyreborg close to Faaborg in 1910

Faaborg is first mentioned as Foburgh in a document located in the French National Archives in Paris dated 25 June 1229. It is a deed of gift that gives Faaborg and the south of Funen as a morning present to Eleanor of Portugal, from Valdemar II to his daughter-in-law. It is mentioned as a castle (Foburgh meaning Fox Castle), so it must have existed before this date. However, this date has been used as the birth date of Faaborg and thus the town celebrated its 775th anniversary in 2004.

Although it is not known when the settlement was established, it appears Faaborg had already received privileges as a market town in the 13th century. Located on a promontory surrounded by water on three sides, the site was further protected by a moat and a town wall. Around 1477, a monastery was established which over the years acquired most of the property in the town and its surroundings. After the Reformation it was used for a time as a hospital until it was finally demolished. The monastery chapel became the parish church.

In the 16th and 17th centuries, Faaborg had to compete with a considerable amount of illegal trading from other settlements along the coast. In the mid-17th century, it suffered even more from the effects of the Swedish Wars but it began to prosper as an important port in the 18th century. Corn was exported to Norway and trade increased with the Grand Duchies of Schleswig and Holstein. By the 1890s, ships from Faaborg sailed as far as the Mediterranean. In the 19th century, the United Kingdom replaced Norway as the main trading partner and, in the second half of the century, trade extended to China and Australia. By the end of the century, there had been a huge increase in population (from 1,000 to 4,000) and a number of light industries had been established. Many of the new inhabitants came from Schleswig and Holstein after these had been lost to Germany. They included many Jews who made Faaborg Funen's most Jewish community with its own synagogue. With 50 employees, Dansk Vin- og Konservesfabrik (wine and canning) was the main business but traditional crafts and trading continued while the harbour was also enlarged. Steamship links with Copenhagen and Southern Jutland were established and in the 1880s railway connections were ensured with the other towns on the island.

Growth was more modest in the 20th century in the face of competition from Odense and Svendborg. A few new industries emerged in food processing and metal working but tourism and services became the leading areas of growth. By 2007, Faaborg had 7,318 inhabitants.

== Landmarks ==
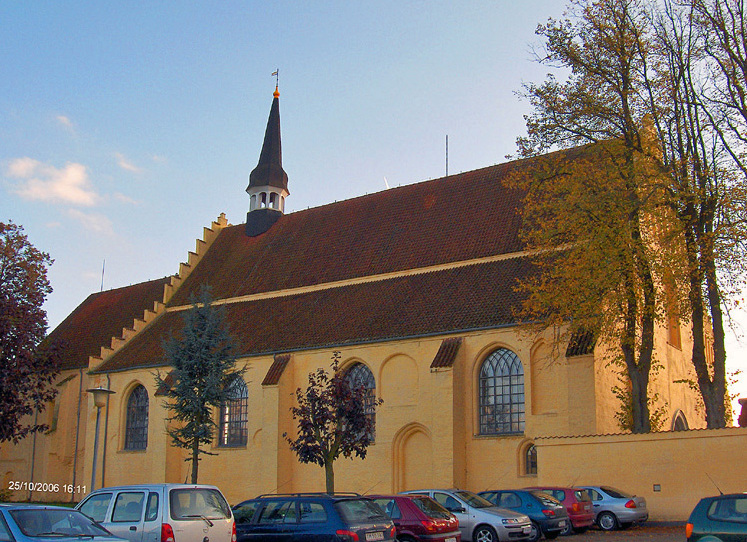
Faaborg Church (Helligåndskirken)

The harbour, old streets, historic mansions and town houses all make Faaborg a pleasant city for visitors. Its many restaurants serve a wide variety of Danish and foreign dishes. Plougs Gård on Vestergade, built around 1790, is one of the finest buildings in the town with its Neoclassical facade. Jesper Ploug made his fortune in shipping during the American Wars of Independence (1776—1783).

Faaborg Church (Helligåndskirken) is an old monastery church dating from 1477. It formed the south wing of the now demolished Helligåndskloster belonging to the Order of the Holy Ghost from which it gets its name. Its considerable size makes it a local landmark: 46 m (151 ft) long by 19 m (62 ft) wide. The chancel and three-sided east gable were completed in 1490, the nave and southern aisle followed around 1510 and a northern aisle was added shortly thereafter. After its vaulting in 1681, it resembled a basilica. Restoration work was carried out in 1858 and 1902. The church has no tower but the tower of the now demolished Saint Nicholas Church (1450) serves as its belfry.

Faaborg Museum holds one of Denmark's most important art collections with works by the Funen Painters including Jens Birkholm, Peter Hansen, Johannes Larsen, and Anna and Fritz Syberg. It also displays some of the finest works of sculptor Kai Nielsen. Den gamle Gård on Holkegade provides insights into the town's cultural history, with exhibits depicting life in the 18th and 19th centuries.

Faaborg Harbour, with its centrally placed marina, attracts about 13,000 pleasure boats each year thanks to its attractive location for the South Funen Archipelago. It is frequently visited by vintage schooners and yachts of all sizes. The port is also used by fishing boats and commercial vessels.

A new waterpark, Faaborg Harbor Bath, was completed in 2014.

Nearby attractions include Egeskov Castle, Hvedholm Castle and Horne Church.

== Transport ==
Faaborg Rutebilstation, a former railway station built in 1882, now serves as a bus station for FynBus. There are regular ferry links from Faaborg to the islands of Bjørnø, Lyø, Avernakø and Ærø.

== Notable people ==
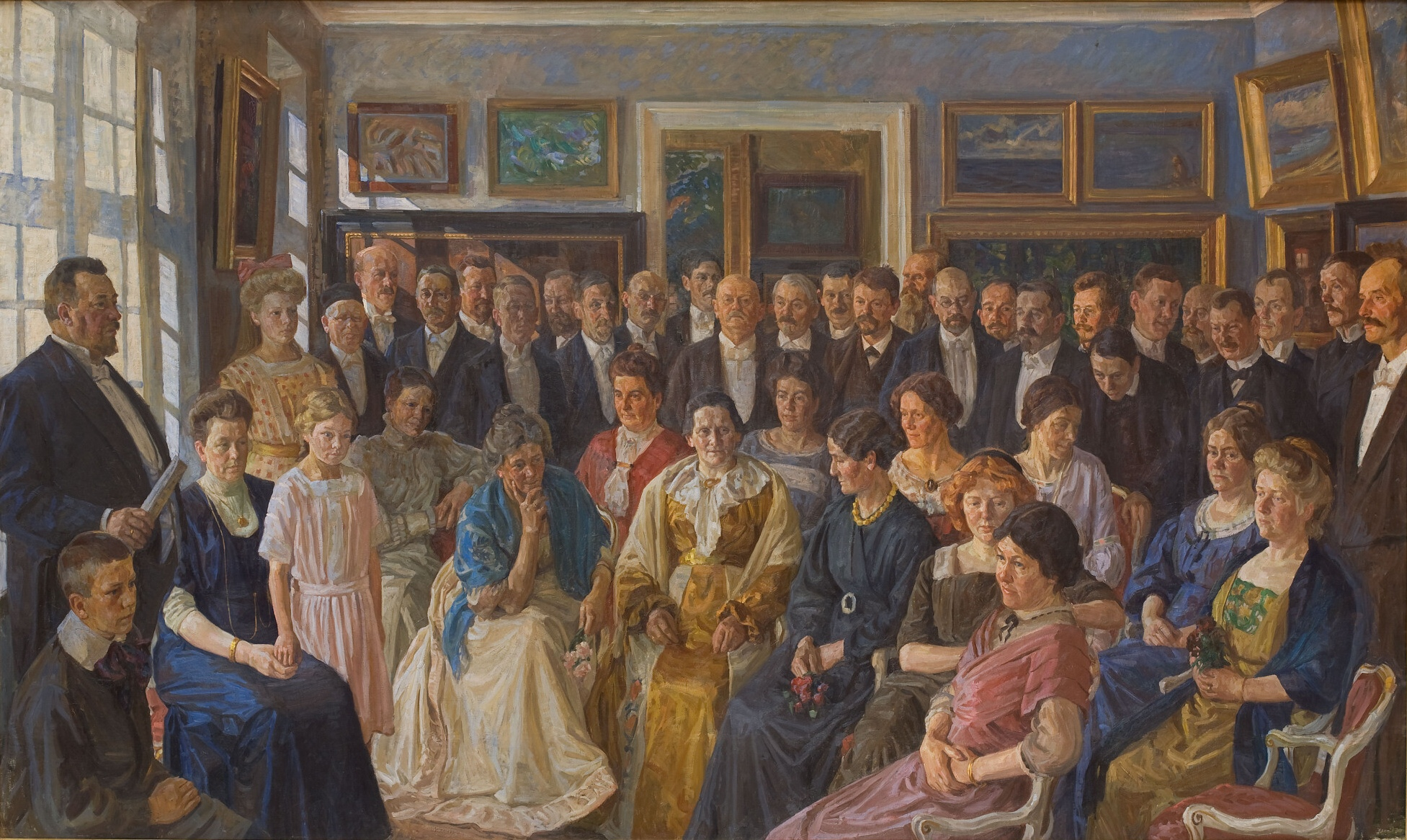
Peter Hansen: Inauguration of Faaborg Museum (1911)

Faaborg is closely associated with the Funen Painters (Fynboerne) including:

- Fritz Syberg, (1862—1939)
- Johannes Larsen, (1867–1961)
- Peter Hansen, (1868—1928)
- Jens Birkholm (1869–1915)
- Anna Syberg, (1870—1914)
- Alhed Larsen, (1872—1927)

=== Other notables ===
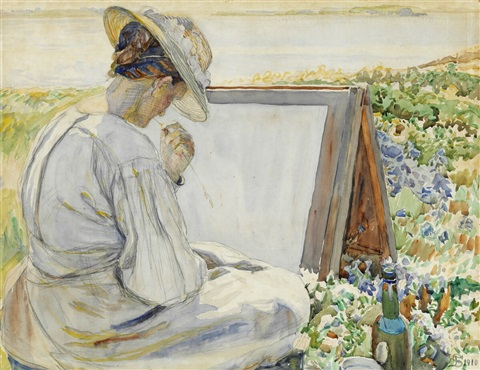
Anna Syberg at her easel by Fritz Syberg, 1910

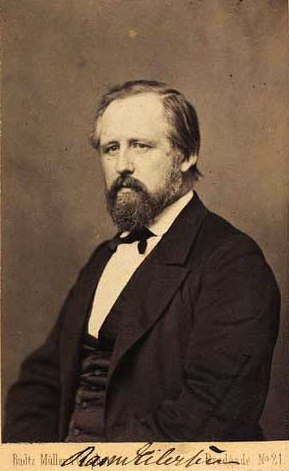
Eiler Rasmussen Eilersen, 1884

- Christian Febiger (1749 in Fåborg – 1796), an American Revolutionary War commander.
- Jens Peter Møller (1783 in Faaborg – 1854), a Danish landscape painter
- Marie Staal (1806 in Faaborg - 1871), a Norwegian-Danish stage actor
- Carl Dahl (1812 in Faaborg — 1865), a marine painter during the Danish Golden Age
- Eiler Rasmussen Eilersen (1827 in Østerby – 1912), a Danish landscape painter
- Niels Moeller Lund (1863 in Faaborg — 1916), an impressionist artist, grew up in Newcastle-upon-Tyne
- Ulrik Hendriksen (1891 in Faaborg – 1960), a Danish-Norwegian painter
- Harald Christensen (1915 in Faaborg – executed in 1945), a member of the Danish resistance movement
- Gunnar Dyrberg (1921 in Faaborg – 2012), a member of the Danish resistance movement
- Rasmus Nellemann (1923 in Millinge – 2004), a Danish painter and illustrator of many abstract postage stamp designs
- Uffe Haagerup (1949–2015), a Danish mathematician, brought up and lived in Faaborg

=== Sport ===
- Aage Madsen (1883 in Faaborg – 1937), a tennis player, competed in the 1912 Summer Olympics
- Aksel Bonde (1918 in Faaborg – 1996), a rower, team silver medallist at the 1948 Summer Olympics
- Ib Storm Larsen (1925 in Faaborg – 1991), a Danish rower, team silver medallist at the 1948 Summer Olympics
- Lasse Norman Hansen (born 1992 in Faaborg), a professional road and track racing cyclist, gold medallist at the 2012 Summer Olympics

== Gallery ==
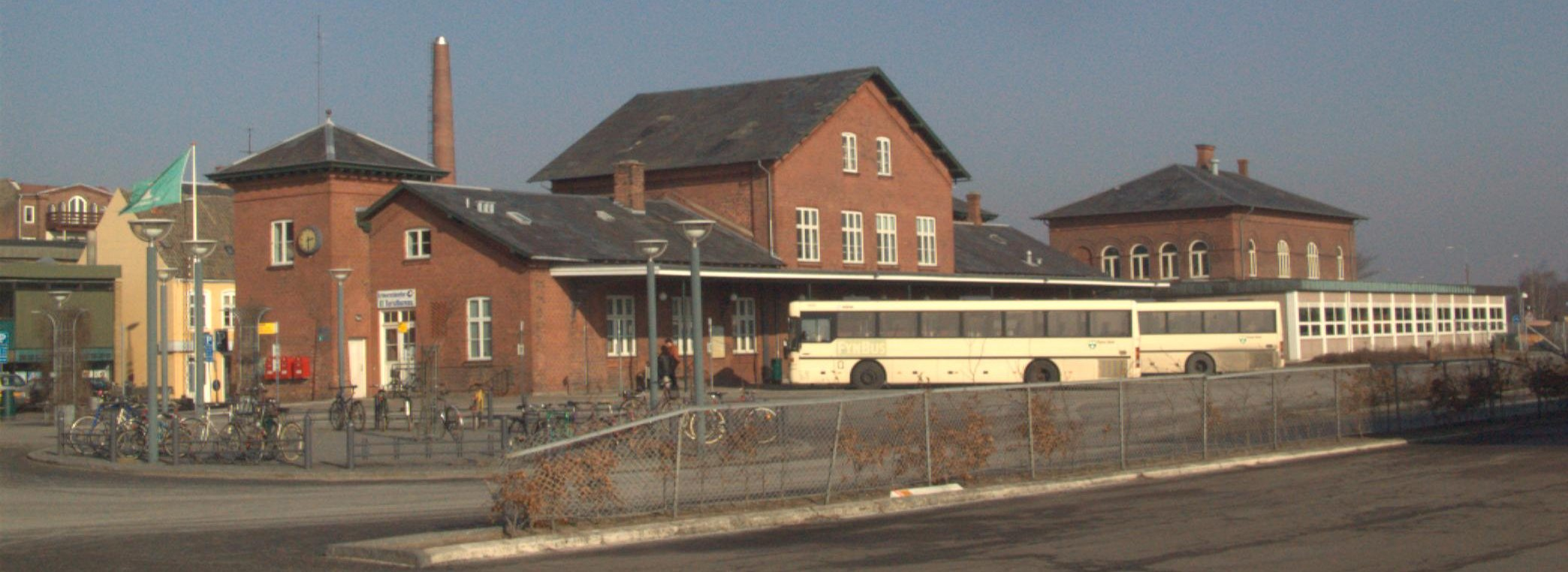
The old railway station, now for buses

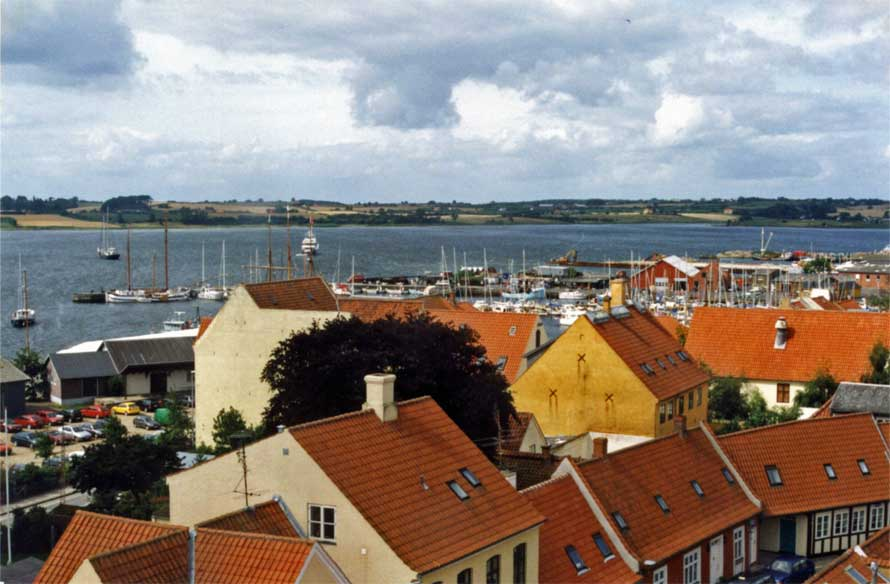
Faaborg Marina

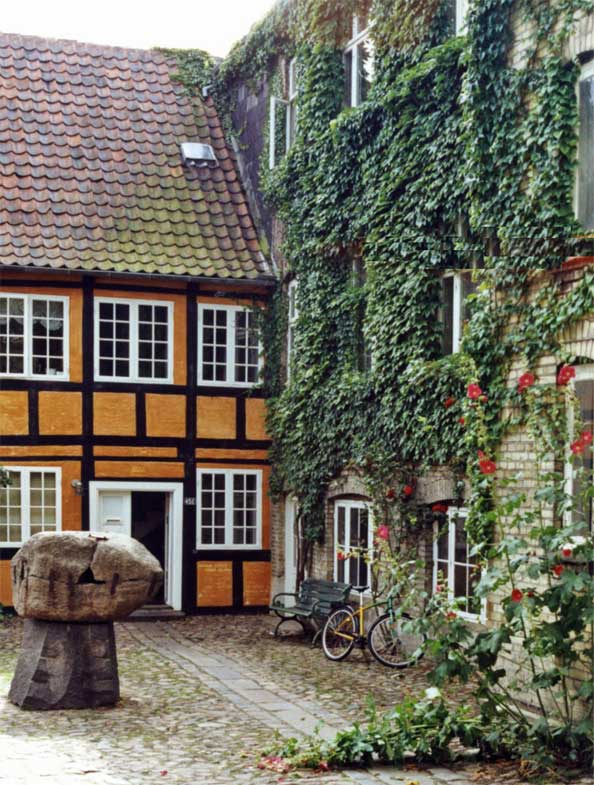
Half-timbered house

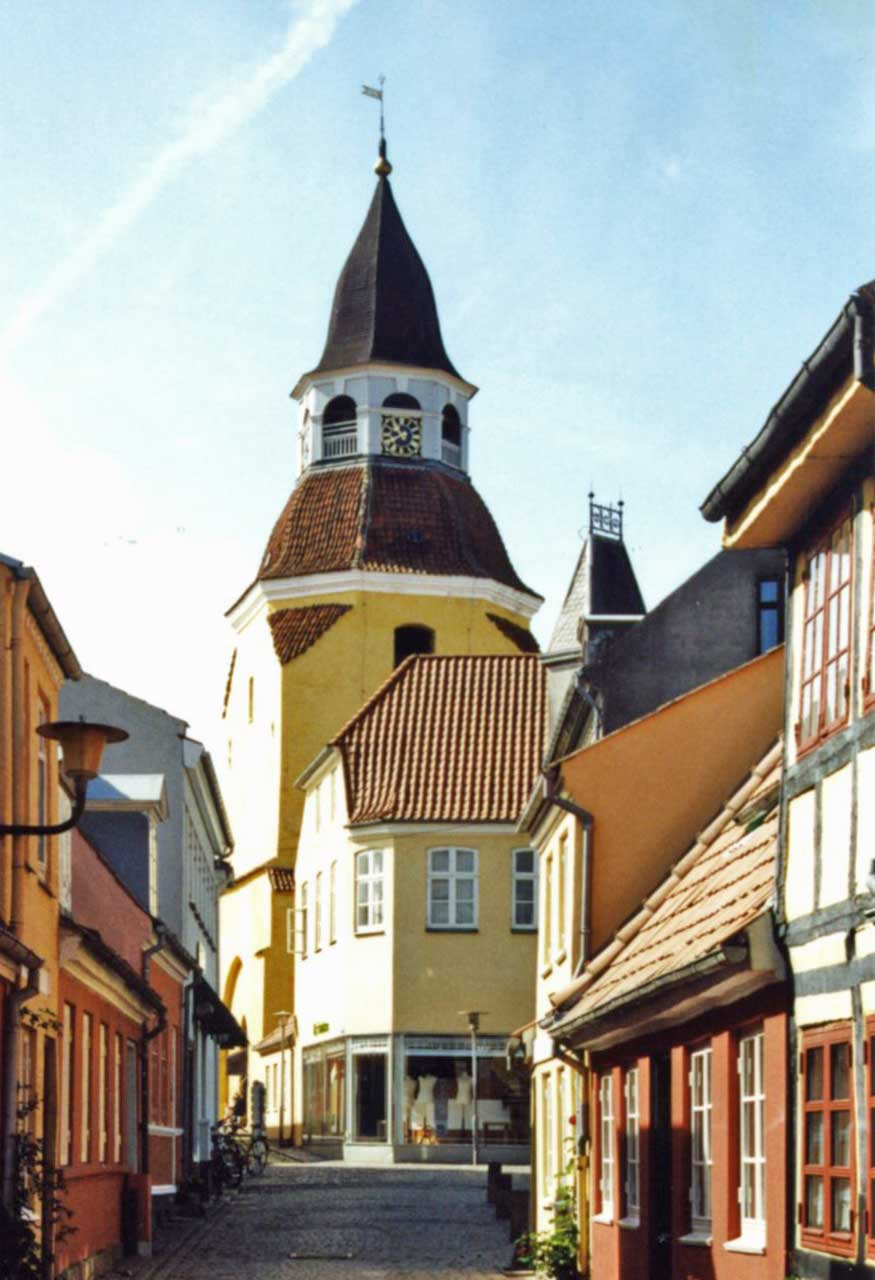
Bell tower

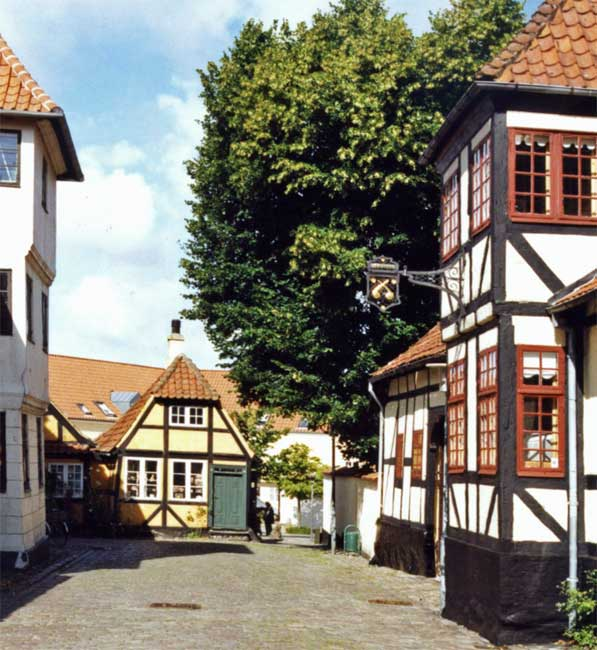
Narrow street

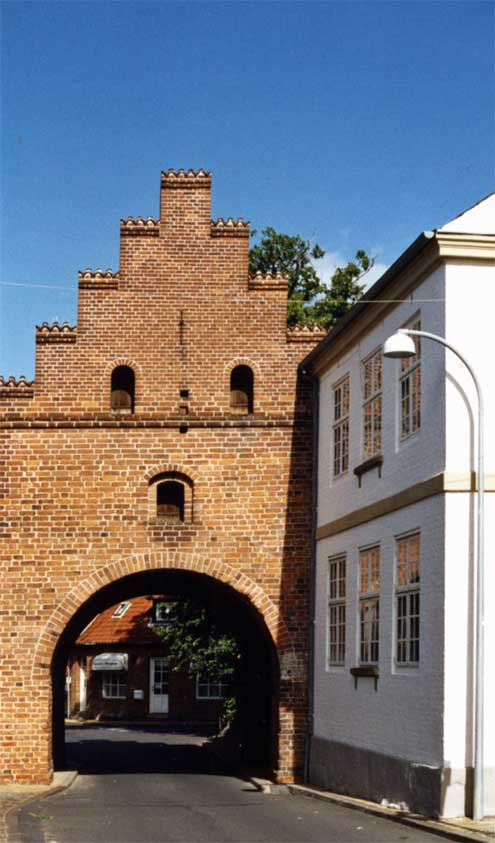
Town gate

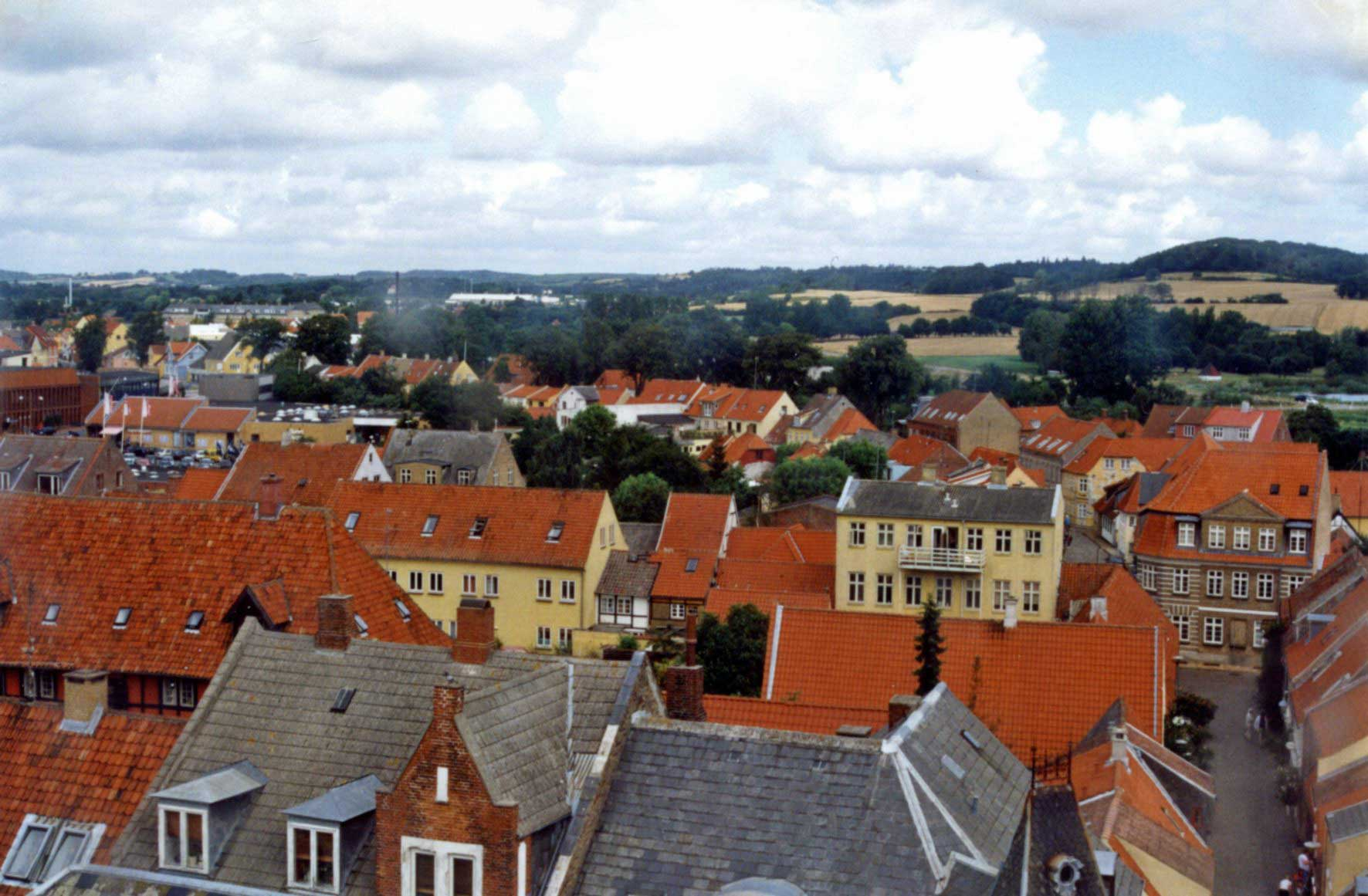
View to the north

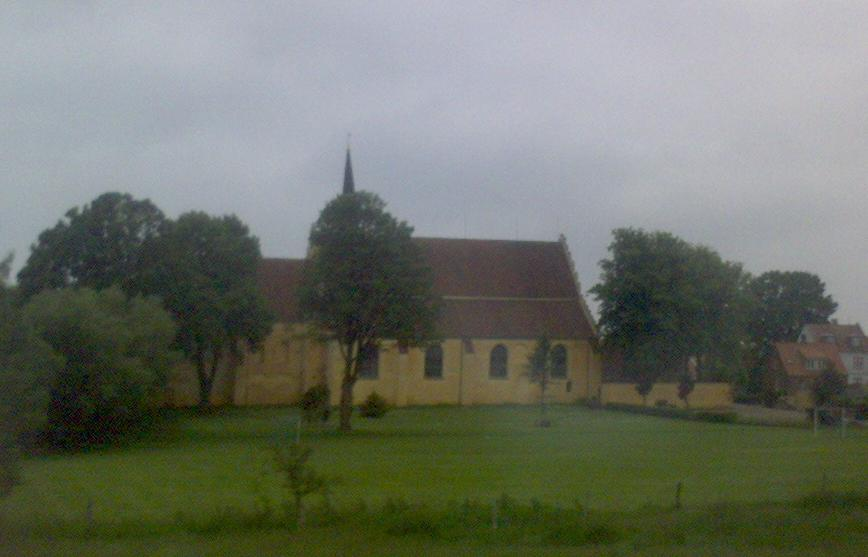
Faaborg Church
