= Oi Prodotes =

Greek reality television series

- Genre: Reality; Game show
- Based on: De Verraders by Marc Pos
- Presented by: Konstantinos Markoulakis
- Country of origin: Greece
- Original language: Greek
- No. of series: 1
- No. of episodes: 12

Production
- Camera setup: Multi-camera
- Production company: Silverline Media

Original release
- Network: ANT1
- Release: 7 June – 7 July 2023

Oi Prodotes (Greek: Οι Προδότες, 'The Traitors') is a Greek reality television series broadcast on ANT1, based on the Dutch series De Verraders, which premiered on 7 June 2023 and is hosted by Konstantinos Markoulakis.

Following the premise of other versions of De Verraders, the show features a group of contestants participating in a game similar to the party game Mafia. In which a small group of contestants become the titular Prodotes (English: 'Traitors'), and must work together to eliminate the other contestants order to win a grand prize, while the remaining contestants become Pisti (English: 'Faithful') and are tasked to discover and banish the Traitors by voting them out, to win the grand prize.

== Format ==
22 strangers arrive at a castle in Spata as Pisti ('Faithful') contestants – hoping to share a prize fund worth up to €100,000. Among them are the Prodotes ('Traitors') – a group of contestants selected by host Konstantinos Markoulakis on the first day, whose goal is to eliminate the Faithful and claim the prize for themselves. Should the Faithful contestants eliminate all the Traitors, they will share the prize fund, but if any Traitor make it to the end, they win the money instead.

Each night, the Traitors come together and decide upon one Faithful contestant to "murder" – and that person will leave the game immediately. The remaining Faithful contestants will not know who has been eliminated until the following day when that person does not enter the Castle for breakfast. The group then take part in a mission to win money for the prize fund. Some challenges will also offer an opportunity for players to visit the Armoury – during which one player will randomly and secretly be awarded the Shield – which awards the player immunity from being Murdered, but not from the Banishment Vote. An attempted murder on the shield holder will result in no player being eliminated by Murder.

At the end of each day, the players will participate in a Round Table, where the players discuss who to vote out before individually voting for a player to be banished. Players cast their votes privately before revealing their votes in turn to everyone once all votes are locked-in, and may give a brief rationale for the vote. The person who received the most votes for banishment is banished from the game and must reveal their affiliation. (Note: As a tie for the highest number of votes never arose during the series, the process that would have been followed in such a case was not revealed.) If a Traitor is eliminated, the remaining Traitors may be given the option to recruit a Faithful to join them. If the Faithful accepts, they become a Traitor from that point on.

== Production ==
A Greek version of De Verraders was first rumoured on 22 January 2023, after Silverline Media acquired the rights to produce it. The program was thought to very likely land at ANT1 from the start, although it was also shown to the Mega Channel and Star Channel networks. Greek actor and ANT1 personality Zeta Makripoulia was initially the frontrunner to host the program, although she later declined to focus on her theatre obligations instead. The show was confirmed for ANT1 and opened applications on 16 March 2023.

On 17 April 2023, actor Konstantinos Markoulakis, who had previously hosted the third season of Survivor Greece, emerged as the new frontrunner to host. He was officially confirmed on 24 April 2023, after which he immediately started recording the show. A first teaser was shown on 28 April 2023.

== Contestants ==
22 contestants competed on the first series of Oi Prodotes.

List of Oi Prodotes contestants
Contestant	Age	From	Occupation	Affiliation	Finish						
Contestant	Age	From	Occupation	Affiliation	Finish	Vasilis Vassiliou	35	Athens	Hair & Make up artist	Faithful	Murdered (Episode 2)
Marianna Giallousi	57	Thessaloniki	Energy Healer/Life Coach	Banished (Episode 2)						Faithful	
Sia Karvela	26	Aigio	Babysitter/Security	Murdered (Episode 3)						Faithful	
Verone	39	Athens	Εscape room creator	Banished (Episode 3)						Faithful	
Iasonas Tsourounakis	37	Athens	Professional Poker Player	Murdered (Episode 4)						Faithful	
Giorgos Kotoglou	21	Thessaloniki	College student	Traitor	Banished (Episode 4)						
Thanos Kasoumis	31	Thessaloniki	Focus stores manager	Faithful	Walked (Episode 5)						
Maria Theofanidou	43	Miami	Physical education teacher	Faithful	Banished (Episode 5)						
Spyros Stoufis	64	Athens	Retired	Faithful	Murdered (Episode 6)						
Giorgos Mitropoulos	36	Trikala	Theologian	Faithful	Banished (Episode 6)						
Marina Karatzoglou	43	Drama	Household	Traitor	Banished (Episode 7)						
Antonis Kalogerakis	33	Crete	Presenter/Social Media Manager	Faithful	Murdered (Episode 8)						
Giannis Sarafidis	44	Thessaloniki	Businessman	Faithful	Banished (Episode 8)						
Giorgos Rizopoulos	51	Ioannina	Stand-up comedian/Electrical Engineer	Faithful	Banished (Episode 9)						
Giorgos Rizopoulos	51	Ioannina	Stand-up comedian/Electrical Engineer	Traitor	Banished (Episode 9)						
Maria Goutridou	42	Komotini	Gym manager	Faithful	Murdered (Episode 10)						
Katerina Malasidou	38	Athens	Bank Employee	Faithful	Banished (Episode 10)						
Konstantinos Mirallais	31	Nicosia	Professional basketball player/CPA	Traitor	Banished (Episode 12)						
Eva Katopodi	35	Thessaloniki	Gymnast	Faithful	Murdered (Episode 12)						
Gogo Rizou	21	Lesbos	Model	Faithful	Banished (Episode 12)						
Anastasia Pasia	29	Athens	Actress/Diving Instructor	Faithful	Runner-up (Episode 12)						
Anastasia Terzi	27	Athens	Singer/Businesswoman	Faithful	Runner-up (Episode 12)						
Giorgos Talias	56	Pavliani	Retired Navy/Hotelier	Faithful	Winner (Episode 12)						
Giorgos Talias	56	Pavliani	Retired Navy/Hotelier	Traitor	Winner (Episode 12)						

Giorgos Talias won the final prize €79,100.

== Voting history ==
Episode	1	2	3	4	5	6	7	8	9	10	11	12	
Traitor's Decision	None	Vasilis	Sia	Iasonas	Giorgos R.	Spyros	Antonis; Eva; Giorgos T.	Antonis	Giorgos T.	Maria G.	Anastasia P.; Eva; Giorgos T.	Eva	None
Traitor's Decision	None	Murder			Offer	Murder	On trial	Murder	Offer	Murder	On trial	Murder	None
Banishment	Anastasia P.; Giannis	Marianna	Verone	Giorgos K.	Maria T.	Giorgos M.	Marina	Giannis	Giorgos R.	Katerina	Konstantinos	Gogo	None
Vote	Least likely to win	9–7–3	10–5–2	14–2–1	11–3–1	12–1	9–2–1	4–3–2–1	7–1–1	5–3	4–1–1–1	4–1	None
Giorgos T.	No vote	Marianna	Verone	Giorgos K.	Spyros	Giorgos M.	Anastasia T.	Giannis	Giorgos R.	Gogo	Gogo	Gogo	Winner (Episode 12)
Anastasia P.	No vote	Eliminated	No vote	Giorgos K.	Maria T.	Giorgos M.	Marina	Giorgos R.	Giorgos R.	Katerina	Konstantinos	Gogo (x2)	Runner-up (Episode 12)
Anastasia T.	No vote	Giorgos R.	Eva	Giorgos K.	Maria T.	Giorgos M.	Marina	Giorgos R.	Giorgos R.	Katerina	Konstantinos	Gogo	Runner-up (Episode 12)
Gogo	No vote	Iasonas	Spyros	Giorgos K.	Maria T.	Giorgos M.	Marina	Eva	Giorgos R.	Katerina (x2)	Anastasia T.	Anastasia T.	Banished (Episode 12)
Eva	No vote	Marianna	Verone	Giorgos K.	Maria T.	Giorgos M.	Marina	Giannis	Giorgos T.	Gogo	Konstantinos (x2)	Murdered (Episode 12)	
Konstantinos	No vote	Giorgos R.	Verone	Giorgos K.	Maria T.	Giorgos M.	Marina	Giannis	Giorgos R.	Katerina	Anastasia P.	Banished (Episode 12)	
Katerina	No vote	Marianna	Verone	Giorgos K.	Maria T.	Giorgos M.	Marina	Konstantinos	Giorgos R.	Gogo	Banished (Episode 10)		
Maria G.	No vote	Iasonas	Spyros	Giorgos K.	Maria T.	Giorgos M.	Marina	Giorgos R.	Giorgos R.	Murdered (Episode 10)			
Giorgos R.	No vote	Marianna	Verone	Giorgos K.	Maria T.	Giorgos M.	Anastasia T.	Giannis	Anastasia T.	Banished (Episode 9)			
Giannis	No vote	Eliminated	No vote	Giorgos K.	Maria T.	Giorgos M.	Marina	Eva	Banished (Episode 8)				
Antonis	No vote	Giorgos R.	Eva	Eva	Spyros	Giorgos M.	Marina	Murdered (Episode 8)					
Marina	No vote	Marianna	Verone	Giorgos K.	Maria T.	Giorgos M.	Antonis	Banished (Episode 7)					
Giorgos M.	No vote	Marianna	Verone	Giorgos K.	Spyros	Antonis	Banished (Episode 6)						
Spyros	No vote	Marianna	Verone	Giorgos K.	Maria T.	Murdered (Episode 6)							
Maria T.	No vote	Giorgos R.	Eva	Eva	Konstantinos	Banished (Episode 5)							
Thanos	No vote	Iasonas	Verone	Giorgos K.	Walked (Episode 5)								
Giorgos K.	No vote	Marianna	Eva	Konstantinos	Banished (Episode 4)								
Iasonas	No vote	Marianna	Verone	Murdered (Episode 4)									
Verone	No vote	Giorgos R.	Eva	Banished (Episode 3)									
Sia	No vote	Giorgos R.	Murdered (Episode 3)										
Marianna	No vote	Giorgos R.	Banished (Episode 2)										
Vasilis	No vote	Murdered (Episode 2)											

Key
The contestant was a Faithful.
The contestant was a Traitor.
The contestant was ineligible to vote.
The contestant casting this vote was on Trial at this Round Table and were one of the only people subsequently eligible for being Murdered.
The contestant casting this vote won a Shield and was immune from being murdered, but was still eligible for Banishment.

== Ratings ==
No.	Episode	Date	Timeslot (EET)	Share		Source
No.	Episode	Date	Timeslot (EET)	Household	Adults 18-54	Source
1	"Episode 1"	June 7, 2023	Wednesday 9:00pm	8.6%	15.4%	
2	"Episode 2"	June 8, 2023	Thursday 9:00pm	6.9%	10.6%	
3	"Episode 3"	June 9, 2023	Friday 9:00pm	9.7%	14.4%	
4	"Episode 4"	June 14, 2023	Wednesday 9:00pm	5.3%	7.4%	
5	"Episode 5"	June 16, 2023	Friday 9:00pm	9.8%	13.4%	
6	"Episode 6"	June 21, 2023	Wednesday 9:00pm	5.1%	7.7%	
7	"Episode 7"	June 22, 2023	Thursday 9:00pm	7.1%	10.9%	
8	"Episode 8"	June 23, 2023	Friday 9:00pm	5.8%	8.0%	
9	"Episode 9"	June 29, 2023	Thursday 9:00pm	8.8%	5.0%	
10	"Episode 10"	June 30, 2023	Friday 9:00pm	8.6%	5.4%	
11	"Episode 11"	July 6, 2023	Thursday 9:00pm	9.2%	5.2%	
12	"Episode 12"	July 7, 2023	Friday 9:00pm	13.6%	8.8%	
