= The Traitors =

TV series franchise

- Created by: Marc Pos; Jasper Hoogendoorn
- Original work: De Verraders
- Owner: Banijay Entertainment
- Years: 2021–present

Films and television
- Television series: The Traitors (see international versions)

Miscellaneous
- Genre: Reality television
- First aired: 13 March 2021

The Traitors is a reality game show franchise created by the All3Media company IDTV which originally aired on RTL 4 in the Netherlands as De Verraders in 2021.

The Traitors features a group of contestants participating in a social deduction game similar to Mafia/Werewolf and Among Us, as they stay in a historical location, like a castle or a manor. During their stay, a small group of contestants become the titular "Traitors", and must work together to eliminate the other contestants to win a grand prize, while the remaining contestants become "Faithfuls" and are tasked to discover and banish the Traitors by voting them out, to win the grand prize.

== Gameplay ==
The players are divided into two groups: the "Faithfuls" and the "Traitors", with only the latter group having knowledge of each other's group affiliation. The Faithfuls must work together to identify and eliminate the Traitors through banishment before the end of the game, while the Traitors' objective is to remain undetected and escape banishment.

On most nights, the Traitors come together and decide upon one Faithful contestant to "murder" – and that person will leave the game immediately. The remaining Faithful contestants will not know who has been eliminated until the following day when that person does not enter the room for breakfast. The group then take part in a mission to win money for the prize fund. In most versions, the missions offered an opportunity for players to win (both secretly and openly) game advantages - including a Shield (which awards immunity from Murder, but not from banishment) and a Dagger (awarding a Double Vote at the Banishment Ceremony)

At the end of most days, the players will participate in a Round Table, where the players discuss who to vote out before individually voting for a player to be banished. Players cast their votes privately before revealing their votes in turn to everyone once all votes are locked-in and may give a brief rationale for their vote. The person who received the most votes for banishment is banished from the game and must reveal which group (Faithfuls or Traitors) they belonged to. The tie-break mechanic vairies between versions.

During the game, if the number of remaining Traitors drops to two, they will be given the option to recruit a Faithful to join them in lieu of committing a murder. The Faithful will have the option to decline, and declining may or may not result in them being murdered immediately. If the Faithful accepts, they become a Traitor from that point on.

After the final round table, the remaining players vote whether to end the game or to continue the game. A unanimous vote to end the game is required; if there is at least one vote to continue, another banishment vote is immediately conducted, before repeating the vote to end the game with the remaining players. When a unanimous vote to end the game occurs, or when there are only two players left, the remaining players reveal whether they are a Faithful or a Traitor. If the remaining players are Faithfuls, they will share the prize fund; but if any Traitors make it to the end, they will win the full prize fund instead.

The number of players varies season to season and from franchise to franchise. The number of Traitors that start the game also varies season to season. In some versions, the players are celebrities. The American version notably focuses on casting former reality TV personalities.

== International versions ==
Legend:

Currently airing
Upcoming seasons
Awaiting confirmation
No longer in production

Country/Region	Local title	Network	Winners	Host(s)
Argentina	TBA	Telefe	Season 1, 2026: Announced	Nicolás Occhiato
Australia	The Traitors	Network 10	Season 1, 2022: Alex Duggan (Traitor); Season 2, 2023: No winner (Note: While there were three Traitors who made it to the final round, they subsequently lost the prize money after the "Traitor's Dilemma."); Season 3, 2026: Kirby Bentley (Traitor); Season 4, 2027: Upcoming season	Current; Gretel Killeen (3–present); Former; Rodger Corser (1–2)
Belgium	De Verraders (Flemish)	VTM	Season 1, 2022: Bart Kaëll, Kim Van Oncen, Niels Albert and Ward Lemmelijn (Faithfuls); Season 2, 2023: Bart Appeltans and Guy T'Sjoen (Traitors); Season 3, 2024: Roman Van Houtven, Sean Dhondt and William Boeva (Traitors); Season 4, 2025: Charlotte Sieben, Eliyha Altena and Yannick Noben (Faithfuls); Season 5, 2026: Stephanie Coorevits (Traitor)	Staf Coppens
Belgium	Les Traîtres (French)	RTL-TVI	Season 1, 2021–22: Philippe Scofield and Pholien Systermans (Faithfuls); Season 2, 2023: Vanessa Matagne (Traitor); Season 3, 2024: Toma Nikiforov (Traitor)	Frédéric Etherlinck
Brazil	TBA	Universal+	Season 1, TBA: Announced	TBA
Bulgaria	Traitors: Igra na predateli (Traitors: Игра на предатели)	bTV	Season 1, 2025: Daniel Petkanov, Eva Veselinova, Georgi Kodzhabashev and Gloria Petkova (Faithfuls); Season 2, 2026: Current season	Vladimir Karamazov
Canada	The Traitors Canada (English)	CTV	Season 1, 2023: Mike D'Urzo (Traitor); Season 2, 2024: Neda Kalantar (Traitor); Season 3, 2025: Dom Gabriel and Hollywood Jade (Faithfuls); Season 4, 2026: Current season	Karine Vanasse
Canada	Les Traîtres (French)	Noovo	Season 1, 2024: Cédric Fofana, Chelsea Jones and Kim Hardy (Faithfuls); Season 2, 2025: Audrey Morissette and Kaven Daigle (Faithfuls); Season 3, 2026: Élaine Savard and Jacob Grégoire (Faithfuls); Season 4, 2027: Upcoming season	Karine Vanasse
Croatia	TBA	RTL	Season 1, TBC: Announced	TBA
Czech Republic	Zrádci	Prima	Season 1, 2024: Nicole Šáchová (Traitor); Season 2, 2025: Věra Kirchnerová (Traitor); Season 3, 2026: Current season	Vojtěch Kotek
Denmark	Forræder	TV2	Season 1, 2023: Johannes Nymark (Traitor); Season 2, 2024: Emil Trier, Mikkel Trier and Melissa Bentsen (Faithfuls); Season 3, 2025: Ali Jassem and Nicky Andersen (Faithfuls); Season 4, 2026: Noah Umur Kanber and Soeren Le Schmidt (Traitors)	Lise Rønne
Denmark	Forræder - Ukendt Grund	TV2	Season 1, 2024: Marc Karaket Bach Nielsen (Traitor); Season 2, 2025: Andreas Brodersen, Charlotte Stang and Sherica Zimmermann Fernand (Faithfuls); Season 3, 2026: Emil Husth Marling, Kim Oechsle and Mallu Olivia Cortney Damgaard (Traitors); Season 4, 2027: Upcoming season	Martin Johannes Larsen
Estonia	Reeturid	Kanal 2	Season 1, 2026: Current season	Urmas Vaino
Finland	Petolliset	Nelonen	Season 1, 2023: Heikki Sorsa and Sita Salminen (Traitors); Season 2, 2024: Fatim Diarra, Miisa Nuorgam and Rami Shikeben (Faithfuls); Season 3, 2025: Janne Grönroos, Marjo Toskala and Tiina Forsby (Traitors); Season 4, 2025: Sofia Zida and Susanna Penttilä (Faithfuls); Season 5, 2026: Jasmiina Yildiz and Joona Hellman (Traitors); Season 6, 2026: Ina Mikkola, Michele Murphy-Kaulanen and Teemu Packalén (Traitors)	Christoffer Strandberg
France	Les Traîtres	M6	Season 1, 2022: Clémence Castel and David Douillet (Traitors); Season 2, 2023: Juju Fitcats (Traitor); Season 3, 2024: Hugo Manos and Laurent Ruquier (Traitors); Season 4, 2025: Adil Rami (Traitor); Season 5, 2025: Christine Bravo, Marlène Schiappa and Théo Fernandez (Faithfuls); Season 6, 2026: Adriana Karembeu and Issa Doumbia (Traitors); Season 7, 2026: Upcoming season	Éric Antoine
France	Les Traîtres: Nouvelle Génération	M6	Season 1, 2024: Andy Raconte, Briac Glaud and Romain Goisbeau (Faithfuls)	Éric Antoine
Germany	Die Verräter – Vertraue Niemandem!	RTL	Season 1, 2023: Anna-Carina Woitschack and Vincent Gross (Traitors); Season 2, 2024: Jessica Haller and Oana Nechiti (Traitors); Season 3, 2025: Charlotte Würdig, Mirja du Mont and Motsi Mabuse (Traitors); Season 4, 2026: Ann-Kathrin Bendixen and Peyman Amin (Faithfuls); Season 5, 2027: Upcoming season	
Greece	Οι Προδότες	ANT1	Season 1, 2023: Giorgos Talias (Traitor)	Konstantinos Markoulakis
Hungary	Az Árulók – Gyilkosság a kastélyban	RTL	Season 1, 2023: Ágnes Szabados, Orsi Tapasztó and Tamás Mohai (Faithfuls); Season 2, 2024: Enikő Muri, Izabell Url and Krisztina Hadas (Faithfuls); Season 3, 2024: Gáspár Róka (Traitor); Season 4, 2025: Barbara Schoblocher and Sándor Torghelle (Faithfuls); Season 5, 2026: Piréz Sapkás and Vivien Vasvári (Traitors); Season 6, 2027: Upcoming Season	Attila Árpa
India	The Traitors Hindi	Prime Video	Season 1, 2025: Nikita Luther and Urfi Javed (Faithfuls); Season 2, 2026: Krystle D'Souza and Rida Tharana (Traitors)	Karan Johar
India	The Traitors Telugu	Prime Video	Season 1, 2026: Shravya Varma and Sweekar Agasthi (Traitors)	Teja Sajja
Ireland	The Traitors Ireland	RTÉ One	Series 1, 2025: Kelley Higgins, Oyin Adeyemi and Vanessa Ogbonna (Faithfuls); Series 2, 2026: Anna Murphy and Diego Caixeta (Faithfuls); Series 3, 2027: Upcoming Season	Siobhán McSweeney
Israel	הבוגדים (Habogdim)	Channel 12	Season 1, 2025: Ronnie Insaz (Traitor)	Assi Azar and Rotem Sela
Italy	The Traitors Italia	Prime Video	Season 1, 2025: Giuseppe Giofrè (Traitor); Season 2, 2026: Daniele Gattano and Pasquale La Rocca (Faithfuls)	Alessia Marcuzzi
Indonesia	TBA	KlikFilm	Season 1, TBA: Upcoming season	TBA
Malta	The Traitors Malta	TVM	Season 1, 2027: Upcoming season	TBA
Mexico	TBA	Universal+	Season 1, TBA: Upcoming season	TBA
Mongolia	TBA	Edutainment TV	Season 1, TBA: Upcoming season	TBA
Netherlands	De Verraders	RTL 4	Season 1, 2021: Chatilla van Grinsven (Faithful) and Samantha Steenwijk (Traitor); Season 2, 2022: Dionne Slagter, Steven Brunswijk and Toine van Peperstraten (Faithfuls); Season 3, 2023: Billy Dans, Chahid Charrak and Noor Omrani (Faithfuls); Season 4, 2024: Tristan Eisank (Traitor); Season 5, 2025: Christiaan Bauer and Julia Heetman (Faithfuls); Season 6, 2026: Géza Weisz and Robert van Hemert (Traitors); Season 7, 2027: Upcoming season	Tijl Beckand
Netherlands	De Verraders	Videoland	Videoland Edition, 2021: Britt Scholte and Iliass Ojja (Traitors); Halloween Season 1, 2022: Bastiaan Ragas, Bobbi Eden and Famke Louise (Faithfuls); Halloween Season 2, 2023: Bente Fokkens (Traitor); Halloween Season 3, 2024: Niels Oosthoek (Traitor)	Art Rooijakkers (Videoland Edition); Frank Evenblij (Halloween)
New Zealand	The Traitors NZ	Three	Season 1, 2023: Anna Reeve and Sam Smith (Faithfuls); Season 2, 2024: Bailey Kench (Traitor); Season 3, 2026: Chloe Withrington (Traitor)	Current; Madeleine Sami (3–); Former; Paul Henry(1–2)
Norway	Forræder	TV2	Season 1, 2022: Cathrine Fossum and Karina Hollekim (Traitors); Season 2, 2023: Aslak Maurstad (Traitor); Season 3, 2023: Jon Martin Henriksen and Marlene Stavrum (Faithfuls); Season 4, 2024: Gaute Berg Næss (Traitor); Season 5, 2025: Espen Abrahamsen and Rasmus Wold (Traitors); Season 6, 2026: Christoffer Falleth, Javad El Bakali, Julie Thorsen and Kjetil André Aamodt (Faithfuls)	Mads Hansen
Poland	The Traitors. Zdrajcy	TVN	Season 1, 2024: Justyna Kąkol and Stanley Olatunji Ayọmo (Faithfuls); Season 2, 2025: Grzegorz Raubo, Małgorzata Marczulewska and Tomasz Świtała (Traitors); Season 3, 2026: Iza Chojnacka and Wojtek Matuszak (Traitors); Season 4, 2027: Upcoming season	Malwina Wędzikowska
Portugal	Os Traidores	SIC	Season 1, 2023: Carolina de Brito Palma and Júlio Ferreira (Traitors)	Daniela Ruah
Romania	Trădătorii	Pro TV	Season 1, 2025: Ines Stana (Traitor)	Ana Ularu
Russia unlicensed	Мастер игры (Gamemaster)	TNT	Season 1, 2025: Denis Vlasenko and Svetlana Romashina (Faithfuls); Season 2, 2026: Alina Astrovskaya (Traitor); Season 3, 2027: Upcoming season	Vadim Demchog; Yuri Kolokolnikov
Saudi Arabia	TBA	TBA	Season 1, TBA: Upcoming season	TBA
Serbia	The Traitors Srbija	Prva TV	Season 1, 2026: Current season Season 2, 2027: Upcoming season	Jelena Gavrilović
Slovakia	Zradcovia	TV JOJ	Season 1, 2027: Upcoming season	TBA
South Africa	TBA	TBA	Season 1, TBA: Upcoming season	TBA
South Korea	TBA	TBA	Season 1, 2026: Upcoming season	Cha Seung-Won
Spain	Traitors España	Antena 3	Season 1, 2023: Joana Pastrana and Leo Margets (Faithfuls); Season 2, 2025: Charo González and Juan Ferrer (Faithfuls)	Current; Juanra Bonet (2-); Former; Sergio Peris-Mencheta (1)
Sweden	Förrädarna	TV4	Season 1, 2023: Katia Mosally (Traitor); Season 2, 2024: Kelda Stagg, Nadim Ghazale and Thomas Bodström (Traitors); Season 3, 2025: Kaeli Abdi and Samir Badran (Faithfuls); Season 4, 2025: Ahmed Berhan (Traitor); Season 5, 2026: Patrik Norqvist (Traitor); Season 6, 2026: Current Season	Dragomir Mrsic
Turkey	The Traitors Türkiye	Prime Video; Kanal D	Season 1, 2026: Emir Elidemir, Özgür Balakar and Saadet Özsırkıntı (Traitors); Season 2, 2027: Upcoming season	Giray Altınok
Ukraine	Зрадники (Zradnyky)	Sweet.tv	Season 1, 2025: Anastasiya Bychkova (Traitor); Season 2, 2026: Dmytro Morozyuk (Traitor); Season 3, 2027: Upcoming season	Oleksiy Gnatkovskiy
United Kingdom	The Traitors	BBC One	Series 1, 2022: Aaron Evans, Hannah Byczkowski and Meryl Williams (Faithfuls); Series 2, 2024: Harry Clark (Traitor); Series 3, 2025: Jake Brown and Leanne Quigley (Faithfuls); Series 4, 2026: Rachel Duffy and Stephen Libby (Traitors); Series 5, 2027: Upcoming season	Claudia Winkleman
United Kingdom	The Celebrity Traitors	BBC One	Series 1, 2025: Alan Carr (Traitor); Series 2, 2026: Romesh Ranganathan and Sebastian Croft (Faithfuls)	Claudia Winkleman
United States	The Traitors (Celebrity Edition) (Note: The first season had a mix of celebrities and civilians)	Peacock	Season 1, 2023: Cirie Fields (Traitor); Season 2, 2024: Chris Tamburello and Trishelle Cannatella (Faithfuls); Season 3, 2025: Dolores Catania, Dylan Efron, Gabby Windey and Ivar Mountbatten (Faithfuls); Season 4, 2026: Rob Rausch (Traitor); Season 5, 2027: Upcoming season	Alan Cumming
United States	The Traitors: New Blood (Civilian Edition)	Peacock; NBC	Season 1, 2026: Shane Beatty (Traitor); Season 2, 2027: Upcoming season	Alan Cumming

== Stage adaptation ==
In May 2027, a cycle of five plays based on the show's format called The Traitors: Acts of Betrayal will premiere at the Gillian Lynne Theatre in London's West End. It will be written by John Finnemore and directed by Robert Hastie.

== See also ==
- Mafia (party game)
