= Hvedholm Castle =

Coordinates: 55°6′18.97″N 10°11′30.08″E

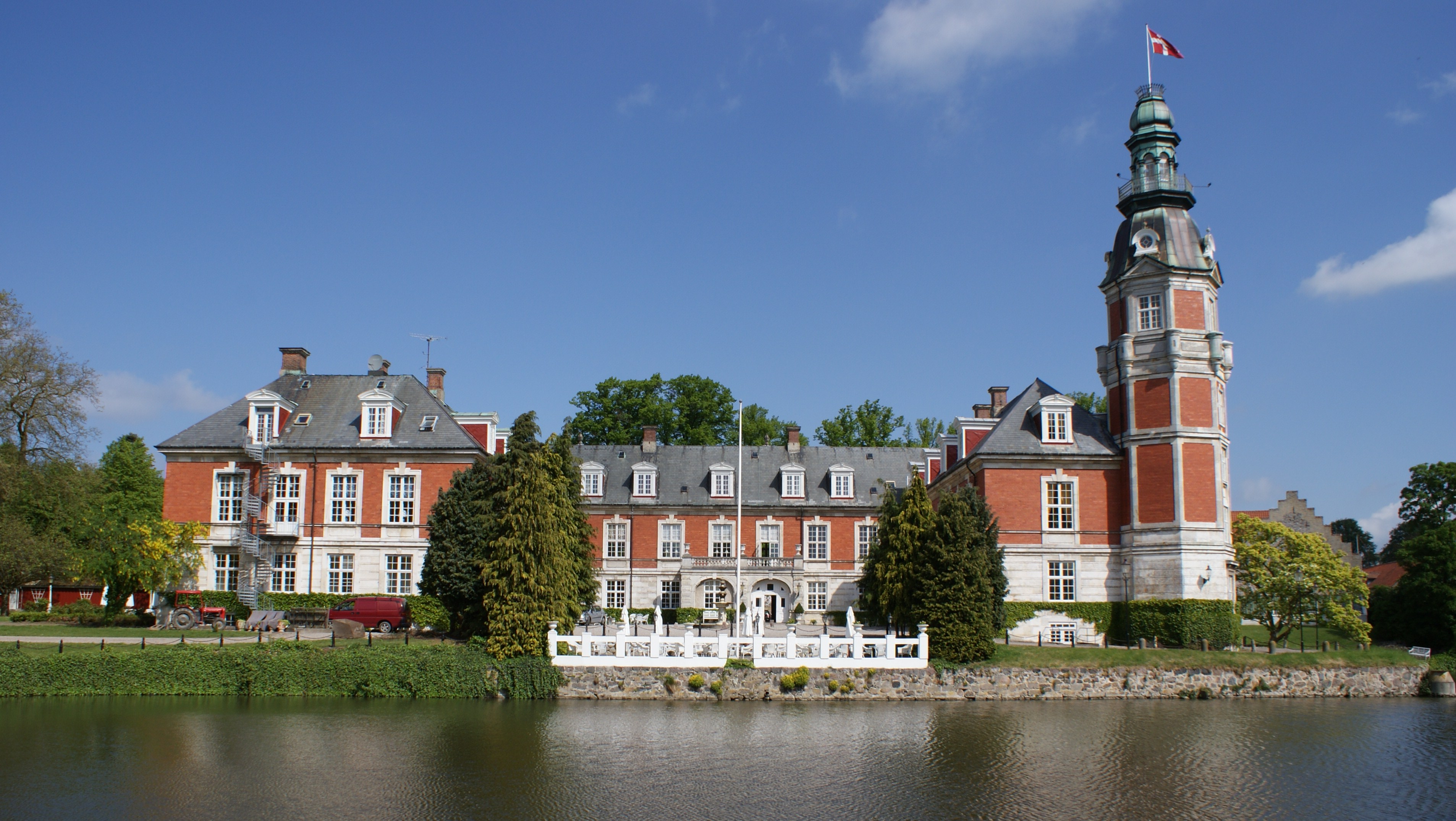
- Hvedholm Castle December 2006.
- Interactive map of the Hvedholm Castle area

General information
- Location: Hvedholm Slot 1, Faaborg, Faaborg, Denmark
- Construction started: 1588

Design and construction
- Architect: Johan Schrøder

Hvedholm Castle is an estate and castle located near Faaborg on the island of Funen, Denmark. It is now the site of Hvedholm Slotshotel.

== History ==
Hvedholm was built in the 15th century. The main building was built in 1588, rebuilt in 1681 after a fire and was rebuilt in 1878–1882 on the basis of drawings by architect Johan Schrøder (1836–1914).

It was owned in turn by the Banke, Hardenberg and Brahe families until 1919, when the Danish government presented the then owners with an enormous tax demand, forcing them to sell it to the state for approximately 175,000 Danish kroner. Hvedholm Castle was later returned to the Brahe family, who were considered for generations the rightful rulers of the castle and surrounding villages. The family was served by the nearby Horne Church.

Today, the castle is the production place of the Danish TV-series Forræder.

Hvedholm Slotshotel is a hotel in the main building on Hvedholm with 62 rooms and a park on 10 hectares. The hotel is part of the chain Danske Slotshoteller.

== Other Sources ==
- (in Danish) Hvedholm Castle Hotel (slotshotel.dk)
