= 2025 Faaborg-Midtfyn municipal election =

Municipal election in Denmark

← 2021	18 November 2025	2029 →

All 25 seats to the Faaborg-Midtfyn municipal council 13 seats needed for a majority
- Turnout: 29,880 (71.4%) ▲2.2%
	First party	Second party	Third party
	A	V	F
Party	Social Democrats	Venstre	Green Left
Last election	10 seats, 36.6%	5 seats, 18.4%	2 seats, 6.2%
Seats won	9	5	2
Seat change	▼1	0	0
Popular vote	9,548	5,633	2,707
Percentage	32.7%	19.3%	9.3%
Swing	▼3.9%	▲0.9%	▲3.1%
	Fourth party	Fifth party	Sixth party
	O	C	Æ
Party	Danish People's Party	Conservatives	Denmark Democrats
Last election	2 seats, 7.4%	3 seats, 12.4%	Did not stand
Seats won	2	2	1
Seat change	0	▼1	▲1
Popular vote	2,365	2,187	1,595
Percentage	8.1%	7.5%	5.5%
Swing	▲0.7%	▼4.9%	New
	Seventh party	Eighth party	Ninth party
	L	Ø	I
Party	Lokallisten Faaborg-Midtfyn	Red-Green Alliance	Liberal Alliance
Last election	1 seat, 5.1%	1 seat, 4.6%	Did not stand
Seats won	1	1	1
Seat change	0	0	▲1
Popular vote	1,532	1,261	1,136
Percentage	5.2%	4.3%	3.9%
Swing	▲0.1%	▼0.3%	New
Mayor before election
Hans Stavnsager
Social Democrats
Mayor after election
Anstina Krogh
Social Democrats

The 2025 Faaborg-Midtfyn Municipal election was held on November 18, 2025, to elect the 25 members to sit in the regional council for the Faaborg-Midtfyn Municipal council, in the period of 2026 to 2029. Anstina Krogh from the Social Democrats, would win the mayoral position.

== Background ==
Following the 2021 election, Hans Stavnsager from Social Democrats became mayor for his second term. However, Stavnsager announced that he will not seek re-election, citing dissatisfaction with his own party, "Sometimes it seems like it's more about getting the right headline in the national media than about solving the problems that actually exist in our society. That includes my own party as well." Instead Anstina Krogh, will be the mayoral candidate from the Social Democrats in this election.

== Electoral system ==
For elections to Danish municipalities, a number varying from 9 to 31 are chosen to be elected to the municipal council. The seats are then allocated using the D'Hondt method and a closed list proportional representation. Faaborg-Midtfyn Municipality had 25 seats in 2025.

== Electoral alliances ==
=== Electoral Alliance 1 ===
Party		Political alignment
B	Social Liberals	Centre to Centre-left
L	Lokallisten Faaborg-Midtfyn	Local politics
M	Moderates	Centre to Centre-right

=== Electoral Alliance 2 ===
Party		Political alignment
C	Conservatives	Centre-right
I	Liberal Alliance	Centre-right to Right-wing
O	Danish People's Party	Right-wing to Far-right
Æ	Denmark Democrats	Right-wing to Far-right

=== Electoral Alliance 3 ===
Party		Political alignment
F	Green Left	Centre-left to Left-wing
Ø	Red-Green Alliance	Left-wing to Far-Left

== Results by polling station ==
Division	A	B	C	F	I	L	M	O	V	Æ	Ø
Division	%	%	%	%	%	%	%	%	%	%	%
Allested-Vejle	22.0	1.6	5.1	10.4	3.4	2.5	1.1	18.9	24.5	7.2	3.4
Brobyværk	26.6	3.2	7.5	8.5	3.9	3.8	0.6	8.9	24.7	6.6	5.7
Nørre Broby	19.5	2.5	5.8	9.1	4.4	3.8	0.7	12.3	32.7	6.6	2.7
Vester Hæsinge	21.8	0.7	11.1	9.7	2.8	6.9	0.7	10.4	20.6	9.3	6.0
Avernakø	36.8	1.5	4.4	13.2	2.9	1.5	0.0	4.4	20.6	2.9	11.8
Faaborg	40.5	2.0	5.0	9.5	2.5	7.1	0.2	6.3	17.9	4.2	4.8
Horne Forsamlingshus	29.8	1.5	8.3	8.5	2.5	13.8	0.3	6.2	14.6	9.8	4.6
Korinth	25.1	2.2	5.4	8.3	3.1	19.1	0.4	8.4	15.3	7.7	5.0
Lyø	37.7	0.0	5.8	7.2	1.4	2.9	0.0	14.5	15.9	5.8	8.7
Svanninge	35.9	1.8	8.3	9.9	2.0	9.7	0.2	6.2	15.0	6.5	4.5
Vester Aaby	46.7	2.0	3.9	7.2	2.6	3.6	0.2	8.3	13.6	6.3	5.6
Espe	34.5	1.7	5.5	7.1	2.8	7.9	0.9	8.7	19.2	7.9	3.9
Hillerslev	16.9	3.2	8.2	9.0	4.2	6.9	0.4	13.6	25.1	8.5	3.8
Ringe	29.4	4.1	6.5	9.3	4.4	1.8	0.8	7.0	28.2	4.0	4.6
Søllinge	25.0	6.8	8.7	12.0	2.6	3.7	1.6	8.6	19.7	7.7	3.7
Gislev	45.2	1.7	3.7	4.2	4.8	10.8	0.3	8.7	11.1	5.9	3.7
Kværndrup	35.2	2.5	5.5	8.4	12.0	3.1	0.2	8.1	14.1	6.9	4.0
Ryslinge	33.9	3.4	7.3	10.8	3.4	3.9	0.7	8.7	17.1	5.6	5.1
Nr. Lyndelse	32.8	3.3	8.7	12.8	4.7	3.1	0.7	8.5	18.6	4.4	2.5
Ferritslev	31.3	3.1	29.8	5.8	3.4	1.4	0.4	6.2	11.1	4.0	3.5
Årslev	33.3	13.3	8.2	10.1	4.5	1.1	0.5	7.2	14.4	3.3	4.1

== Results ==
Party		Votes	%	+/-	Seats	+/-
Faaborg-Midtfyn Municipality
A	Social Democrats	9,548	32.70	-3.89	9	-1
V	Venstre	5,633	19.29	+0.86	5	0
F	Green Left	2,707	9.27	+3.08	2	0
O	Danish People's Party	2,365	8.10	+0.72	2	0
C	Conservatives	2,187	7.49	-4.86	2	-1
Æ	Denmark Democrats	1,595	5.46	New	1	New
L	Lokallisten Faaborg-Midtfyn	1,532	5.25	+0.15	1	0
Ø	Red-Green Alliance	1,261	4.32	-0.28	1	0
I	Liberal Alliance	1,136	3.89	New	1	New
B	Social Liberals	1,085	3.72	-1.58	1	0
M	Moderates	154	0.53	New	0	New
Total		29,203	100	N/A	25	N/A
Invalid votes		98	0.23	+0.02		
Blank votes		579	1.38	+0.25		
Turnout		29,880	71.38	+2.23		
Source: valg.dk

== Opinion polls ==
Polling firm	Fieldwork date	Sample size	A	V	C	O	F	B	L	Ø	I	M	Æ	Others	Lead
Epinion	4 Sep - 13 Oct 2025	485	37.9	20.9	4.4	7.0	8.1	1.4	–	4.2	3.6	2.4	8.4	1.6	17.0
2024 european parliament election	9 Jun 2024		20.8	16.2	7.0	7.4	16.0	5.0	–	4.5	5.3	5.9	10.0	–	4.6
2022 general election	1 Nov 2022		33.9	13.1	4.5	2.9	7.2	2.2	–	3.5	5.3	9.6	10.5	–	20.8
2021 regional election	16 Nov 2021		27.2	34.4	7.3	6.3	7.3	4.9	–	5.3	0.7	–	–	–	7.2
2021 municipal election	16 Nov 2021		36.6 (10)	18.4 (5)	12.4 (3)	7.4 (2)	6.2 (2)	5.3 (1)	5.1 (1)	4.6 (1)	–	–	–	–	18.2
