= 2021 Faaborg-Midtfyn municipal election =

← 2017	16 November 2021	2025 →

All 25 seats to the Faaborg-Midtfyn Municipal Council 13 seats needed for a majority
- Turnout: 28,572 (69.2%) ▼5.6pp
	First party	Second party	Third party
	A	V	C
Party	Social Democrats	Venstre	Conservatives
Last election	8 seats, 31.0%	7 seats, 23.7%	1 seat, 5.5%
Seats won	10	5	3
Seat change	▲2	▼2	▲2
Popular vote	10,243	5,160	3,458
Percentage	36.6%	18.4%	12.4%
Swing	▲5.6%	▼5.3%	▲6.9%
	Fourth party	Fifth party	Sixth party
	O	F	B
Party	Danish People's Party	Green Left	Social Liberals
Last election	4 seats, 14.5%	1 seat, 6,4%	2 seats, 5.0%
Seats won	2	2	1
Seat change	▼2	▲1	▼1
Popular vote	2,067	1,734	1,483
Percentage	7.4%	6.2%	5.3%
Swing	▼7.1%	▼0.2%	▲0.3%
	Seventh party	Eighth party
	L	Ø
Party	Lokallisten Faaborg-Midtfyn	Red–Green Alliance
Last election	0 seats, 2,4%	1 seat, 4,2%
Seats won	1	1
Seat change	▲1	0
Popular vote	1,428	1,287
Percentage	5.1%	4.6%
Swing	▲2.7%	▲0.4%
Mayor before election
Hans Stavnsager
Social Democrats
Mayor after election
Hans Stavnsager
Social Democrats

Since the 2007 municipal reform and prior to this election, the Social Democrats had held the mayor's position twice, from 2010 to 2013, and again from 2017 to 2021, while Venstre had held it from 2014 to 2017. Hans Stavnsager would therefore become the first to be re-elected if his bid were successful.

In the 2017 election, the traditional red bloc parties would win just 13 seats, against 12 from parties of the traditional blue bloc. This led to Hans Stavnsager becoming the mayor.

In this election both TV2 Fyn and Mandag Morgen predicted that Hans Stavnsager would win a second term.

In the election result, the parties of the red bloc would win 14 of the 25 seats. Of the red bloc parties, The Alternative who won a seat in the 2017 election, did not stand, while the Social Liberals would lose a seat. However the Social Democrats gained 2 seats, and the Green Left would gain 1 seat, despite the latter decreasing their vote share. Venstre would win 5 seats, the lowest ever in the municipality. . (Note: counting the elections from 2007 and onwards)

Therefore Hans Stavnsager was in pole position to continue, and it was eventually confirmed that he had the mandate to do it.

== Electoral system ==
For elections to Danish municipalities, a number varying from 9 to 31 are chosen to be elected to the municipal council. The seats are then allocated using the D'Hondt method and a closed list proportional representation. Faaborg-Midtfyn Municipality had 25 seats in 2021

Unlike in Danish General Elections, in elections to municipal councils, electoral alliances are allowed.

== Electoral alliances ==
=== Electoral Alliance 1 ===
Party		Political alignment
O	Danish People's Party	Right-wing to Far-right
V	Venstre	Centre-right

=== Electoral Alliance 2 ===
Party		Political alignment
B	Social Liberals	Centre to Centre-left
F	Green Left	Centre-left to Left-wing
Ø	Red–Green Alliance	Left-wing to Far-Left

=== Electoral Alliance 3 ===
Party		Political alignment
C	Conservatives	Centre-right
K	Christian Democrats	Centre to Centre-right
L	Lokalisten Faaborg-Midtfyn	Local politics

== Results by polling station ==
M = De LokalNationale
Z = Vi Lokale Demokrater

Division	A	B	C	D	F	K	L	M	O	V	Z	Ø
Division	%	%	%	%	%	%	%	%	%	%	%	%
Allested-Vejle	26.4	6.0	7.8	5.5	4.6	0.3	1.9	0.0	17.2	26.7	0.1	3.4
Brobyværk	29.6	5.9	9.6	3.0	4.2	0.8	4.8	0.3	7.5	28.9	0.3	5.1
Nørre Broby	28.0	3.9	8.9	5.3	3.7	0.2	1.2	0.5	10.8	34.0	0.1	3.5
Vester Hæsinge	23.7	3.2	20.4	3.5	5.8	0.7	1.9	0.0	12.0	22.3	0.0	6.4
Korinth	31.7	3.6	12.6	4.7	6.0	0.4	3.8	0.0	9.0	20.1	0.3	7.8
Horne	31.7	4.9	14.6	2.0	5.4	0.2	12.3	0.0	7.6	15.2	0.0	6.2
Faaborg	43.4	3.6	11.9	2.1	6.8	0.1	6.1	0.1	8.0	13.3	0.0	4.6
Avernakø	23.7	5.3	5.3	3.9	10.5	0.0	3.9	0.0	1.3	22.4	0.0	23.7
Lyø	20.0	2.9	7.1	0.0	4.3	0.0	0.0	0.0	12.9	51.4	0.0	1.4
Svanninge	38.6	4.1	13.4	1.9	6.5	0.2	6.1	0.4	8.8	14.9	0.0	5.1
Vester Aaby	45.2	2.9	9.3	4.5	5.9	0.2	2.9	0.1	8.6	14.0	0.1	6.4
Espe	39.6	2.6	10.3	3.6	5.0	0.6	3.4	0.3	6.7	23.9	0.1	3.9
Gislev	47.0	3.0	6.5	4.5	3.1	1.0	14.9	0.1	4.7	11.6	0.2	3.5
Søllinge	31.2	7.2	11.9	3.4	6.7	0.2	3.6	0.0	7.4	21.1	0.2	7.2
Ringe	34.8	6.4	14.8	2.7	7.7	0.4	2.3	0.1	4.9	22.3	0.1	3.6
Hillerslev	22.2	4.3	8.7	6.3	6.0	0.9	7.8	0.0	8.5	31.3	0.0	4.3
Kværndrup	37.4	5.8	10.2	5.6	4.8	1.1	3.3	0.3	11.8	15.4	0.0	4.3
Ryslinge	43.3	5.3	10.6	3.9	6.5	0.9	3.6	0.2	6.2	12.4	0.1	7.1
Ferritslev	29.3	3.7	19.2	4.0	2.5	0.3	18.7	0.0	4.3	15.3	0.2	2.6
Nr. Lyndelse	31.6	5.1	15.6	3.6	11.3	0.2	2.0	0.0	6.2	20.6	0.8	2.9
Årslev	42.7	11.9	11.6	3.3	4.8	0.5	3.2	0.1	4.7	12.9	0.0	4.5

== Results ==
Party		Votes	%	+/-	Seats	+/-
Faaborg-Midtfyn Municipality
A	Social Democrats	10,243	36.58	+5.53	10	+2
V	Venstre	5,160	18.43	-5.29	5	-2
C	Conservatives	3,458	12.35	+6.86	3	+2
O	Danish People's Party	2,067	7.38	-7.16	2	-2
F	Green Left	1,734	6.19	-0.17	2	+1
B	Social Liberals	1,483	5.30	+0.33	1	-1
L	Lokallisten Faaborg-Midtfyn	1,428	5.10	+2.69	1	+1
Ø	Red-Green Alliance	1,287	4.60	+0.41	1	0
D	New Right	961	3.43	+2.36	0	0
K	Christian Democrats	111	0.40	New	0	New
Z	De LokalNationale	36	0.13	New	0	New
M	Vi Lokale Demokrater	32	0.11	New	0	New
Total		28,000	100	N/A	25	N/A
Invalid votes		88	0.21	0.0		
Blank votes		484	1.17	-0.26		
Turnout		28,572	69.15	-5.69		
Source: valg.dk
