= Listed buildings in Faaborg-Midtfyn Municipality =

This is a list of listed buildings in Faaborg-Midtfyn Municipality, Denmark.

Note:: This list is incomplete. A complete list of listed buildings in Vordingborg Municipality can be found on Danish Wikipedia.

== The list ==
=== 5600 Faaborg ===
| Listing name | Image | Location | Coordinates | Description |
|---|---|---|---|---|
| Adelgade 7 | | Adelgade 7, 5600 Faaborg | | |
| Arreskov | | Arreskovvej 12, 5600 Faaborg | | |
| Arreskov Watermill | | Arreskovvej 27, 5600 Faaborg | | |
| Arreskov Watermill | | Arreskovvej 27, 5600 Faaborg | | |
| Arreskov Watermill | | Arreskovvej 27, 5600 Faaborg | | |
| Arreskov Watermill | | Arreskovvej 27, 5600 Faaborg | | |
| Birkelund | | Brahesvej 36, 5600 Faaborg | | |
| Birkelund | | Brahesvej 36, 5600 Faaborg | | |
| Birkelund | | Brahesvej 36, 5600 Faaborg | | |
| Birkelund | | Brahesvej 36, 5600 Faaborg | | |
| Birkelund | | Brahesvej 36, 5600 Faaborg | | |
| Brahetrolleborg | | Reventlowsvej 1, 5600 Faaborg | | |
| Brahetrolleborg | | Reventlowsvej 1, 5600 Faaborg | | |
| Brahetrolleborg | | Reventlowsvej 1, 5600 Faaborg | | |
| Brahetrolleborg | | Reventlowsvej 1, 5600 Faaborg | | |
| Brahetrolleborg | | Reventlowsvej 1, 5600 Faaborg | | |
| Brahetrolleborg | | Reventlowsvej 1A, 5600 Faaborg | | |
| Brahetrolleborg | | Reventlowsvej 1G, 5600 Faaborg | | |
| Brahetrolleborg: Godsforvalterboligen | | Reventlowsvej 3, 5600 Faaborg | | |
| Brahetrolleborg Hospital | | Reventlowsvej 1N, 5600 Faaborg | | |
| Brahetrolleborg Hospital | | Reventlowsvej 1P, 5600 Faaborg | | |
| Brahetrolleborg Watermill | | Reventlowsvej 2, 5600 Faaborg | | |
| Brahetrolleborg Watermill | | Reventlowsvej 2, 5600 Faaborg | | |
| Bremerstente, Faurshøjvej 43 | | Faurshøjvej 43, 5600 Faaborg | | |
| Bryggergården | | Bryggergården 2, 5600 Faaborg | | |
| Bryggergården | | Bryggergården 4, 5600 Faaborg | | |
| Bryggergården | | Bryggergården 6, 5600 Faaborg | | |
| Faaborg Clock Tower | | Tårnstræde 2, 5600 Faaborg | 55°5′40.8″N 10°14′36.95″E | Clocktower from c. 1450-1500 with spire from 1778 |
| Faaborg Museum | | Grønnegade 75, 5600 Faaborg | | Museum building from 1912-15 designed by Carl Petersen. |
| Faaborg Town Hall | | Torvet 19, 5600 Faaborg | | |
| Gammelstrand | | Flægmosevej 22, 5600 Faaborg | | |
| Gammelstrand | | Flægmosevej 22, 5600 Faaborg | | |
| Gammelstrand | | Flægmosevej 22, 5600 Faaborg | | |
| Gammelstrand | | Flægmosevej 22, 5600 Faaborg | | |
| Gammelstrand | | Flægmosevej 22, 5600 Faaborg | | |
| Lyø Inn | | Lyø Bygade 14, 5600 Faaborg | | |
| Nakkebølle | | Østergyden 3A, 5600 Faaborg | 55°4′51.61″N 10°21′8.92″E | Main building from 1559 |
| Vester Mølle | | Lagonis Minde 11A, 5600 Faaborg | | |
| Vester Mølle | | Lagonis Minde 11A, 5600 Faaborg | | |
| Vester Mølle | | Lagonis Minde 11A, 5600 Faaborg | | |
| Vestergade 1 D-H | | Vestergade 1E, 5600 Faaborg | | |
| Vestergade 1 D-H | | Vestergade 1F, 5600 Faaborg | | |
| Vestergade 3 | | Vestergade 3, 5600 Faaborg | | |
| Vestergade 7 | | Vestergade 7, 5600 Faaborg | | |
| Vestergade 9 | | Vestergade 9, 5600 Faaborg | | |
| Vestergade 9 | | Vestergade 9A, 5600 Faaborg | | |
| Grubbe Windmill | | Grubbemøllegyden 2, 5600 Faaborg | | |
| Grubbe Watermill | | Grubbemøllegyden 2, 5600 Faaborg | | |
| Grubbe Watermill | | Grubbemøllegyden 2, 5600 Faaborg | | |
| Grubbe Watermill | | Grubbemøllegyden 2, 5600 Faaborg | | |
| Grubbe Watermill | | Grubbemøllegyden 2, 5600 Faaborg | | |
| Grubbe Watermill | | Grubbemøllegyden 2, 5600 Faaborg | | |
| Grubbe Watermill | | Grubbemøllegyden 2, 5600 Faaborg | | |
| Grønnegade 32 | | Grønnegade 32, 5600 Faaborg | | |
| Grønnegade 72 | | Grønnegade 72, 5600 Faaborg | | |
| Grønnegade 73 A | | Grønnegade 73, 5600 Faaborg | | |
| Grønnegade 74-76 | | Grønnegade 74, 5600 Faaborg | | |
| Gøngehuset | | Prices Havevej 39, 5600 Faaborg | | |
| Havnegade 2 | | Havnegade 2, 5600 Faaborg | | |
| Havnegade 28-30 | | Havnegade 30, 5600 Faaborg | | |
| Smedehusene | | Holkegade 2, 5600 Faaborg | | |
| Spanget 3 A-C, Korinth | | Spanget 3, 5600 Faaborg | | |
| Spanget 3 A-C, Korinth | Spanget 3, 5600 Faaborg | | | |
| Spanget 5 A-D, Korinth | | Spanget 5, 5600 Faaborg | | |
| Spanget 5 A-D, Korinth | | Spanget 5, 5600 Faaborg | | |
| Stormgården | | Trekanten 1, 5600 Faaborg | | |
| Stormgården | | Trekanten 1, 5600 Faaborg | | |
| Stormgården | | Trekanten 1, 5600 Faaborg | | |
| Stormgården | | Trekanten 1, 5600 Faaborg | | |
| Stormgården | | Trekanten 1, 5600 Faaborg | | |
| Svanninge Hospital, Stenhuset | | Brahesvej 13, 5600 Faaborg | | |
| Svanninge Hospital, Stenhuset | | Brahesvej 13, 5600 Faaborg | | |
| Torvet 5 | | Torvet 5, 5600 Faaborg | | |
| Tårngade 6-8 | | Tårngade 6, 5600 Faaborg | | |
| Tårngade 12 | Tårngade 12, 5600 Faaborg | | | |
| Tårnstræde 1 A | | Tårnstræde 1A, 5600 Faaborg | | |
| Tårnstræde 3 | Tårnstræde 3, 5600 Faaborg | | | |
| Vesterport | | Vestergade 5, 5600 Faaborg | 55°5′47.96″N 10°14′24.88″E | City gate from the 15th century which was refurbished in 1770, altered in 1879 and refurbished again in 1917 |
| Vilhelmsgave | | Gammelskovvej 31, 5600 Faaborg | | |
| Vilhelmsgave | | Gammelskovvej 31, 5600 Faaborg | | |
| Vilhelmsgave | | Gammelskovvej 31, 5600 Faaborg | | |
| Vilhelmsgave | | Gammelskovvej 31, 5600 Faaborg | | |
| Vilhelmsgave | | Gammelskovvej 31, 5600 Faaborg | | |
| Vilhelmsgave | | Gammelskovvej 31, 5600 Faaborg | | |
| Vægterhuset | | Brændegårdsvej 3A, 5600 Faaborg | | |
| Wedel House | | Vestergade 8, 5600 Faaborg | | |
| Welblund House | | Priorensgade 11, 5600 Faaborg | | |
| Østergade 25 | | Østergade 25A, 5600 Faaborg | | |
| Østrupgård | | Østrup 38, 5600 Faaborg | | |
| Østrupgård | | Østrup 46, 5600 Faaborg | | |
| Østrupgård | | Østrup 50, 5600 Faaborg | | |
| Østrupgård | | Østrup 50, 5600 Faaborg | | |
| Østrupgård | | Østrup 50, 5600 Faaborg | | |
| Østrupgård | | Østrup 50, 5600 Faaborg | | |
| Østrupgård | | Østrup 50, 5600 Faaborg | | |
| Østrupgård | | Østrup 50, 5600 Faaborg | | |
| Østrupgård | | Østrup 50, 5600 Faaborg | | |

=== 5640 ===
| Listing name | Image | Location | Coordinates | Description |
|---|---|---|---|---|
| Falsled Kro | | Assensvej 513, 5642 Millinge | | |
| Falsled Kro | | Assensvej 513, 5642 Millinge | | |
| Smedehusene | | Assensvej 298, 5642 Millinge | | |
| Smedehusene | | Assensvej 298, 5642 Millinge | | |
| Smedehusene | | Assensvej 298, 5642 Millinge | | |
| Steensgaard | | Steensgaard 1, 5642 Millinge | | |
| Steensgaard | | Steensgaard 4, 5642 Millinge | | |

=== 5672 Broby ===
| Listing name | Image | Location | Coordinates | Description |
|---|---|---|---|---|
| Brobygård | | Karlsbjergvej 39A, 5672 Broby | | |
| Brobygård | | Karlsbjergvej 39B, 5672 Broby | | |
| Brobygård | | Karlsbjergvej 39C, 5672 Broby | | |
| Brobygård | | Karlsbjergvej 39, 5672 Broby | | |
| Brobygård | | Karlsbjergvej 39, 5672 Broby | | |
| Brobygård | | Karlsbjergvej 39, 5672 Broby | | |
| Brobygård | | Karlsbjergvej 39, 5672 Broby | | |
| Brobyværk Vandmølle | | Marsk Billesvej 2A, 5672 Broby | | |
| Brobyværk Vandmølle | | Marsk Billesvej 2A, 5672 Broby | | |
| Brobyværk Vandmølle | | Marsk Billesvej 2A, 5672 Broby | | |
| Lundegård | | Lundegårdsvej 44, 5672 Broby | | |
| Lundegård | | Lundegårdsvej 44, 5672 Broby | | |
| Lundegård | | Lundegårdsvej 44, 5672 Broby | | |
| Lundegård | | Lundegårdsvej 44, 5672 Broby | | |
| Lundegård | | Lundegårdsvej 44, 5672 Broby | | |
| Nørre-Broby Præstegård | | Præstegårds Alle 2, 5672 Broby | | |
| Nørre-Broby Præstegård | | Præstegårds Alle 2, 5672 Broby | | |
| Nørre-Broby Præstegård | | Præstegårds Alle 2, 5672 Broby | | |
| Nørre-Broby Præstegård | | Præstegårds Alle 2, 5672 Broby | | |
| Sandholt | | Rishøjvej 2, 5672 Broby | | |
| Vester Hæsinge gamle Skole | | Birkevej 17C, 5672 Broby | | |
| Vester Hæsinge gamle Skole | | Birkevej 17C, 5672 Broby | | |

=== 5750 Ringe ===
| Listing name | Image | Location | Coordinates | Description |
|---|---|---|---|---|
| Fjellebro Hovedgård | | Sundsgårdsvej 8, 5750 Ringe | | |
| Fjellebro Hovedgård | | Sundsgårdsvej 8, 5750 Ringe | | |
| Hellerup | | Hellerupvej 20, 5750 Ringe | | |
| Hillerslev Hospital | | Kirkegyden 3, 5750 Ringe | | |
| Krumstrup | | Krumstrupvej 10, 5750 Ringe | | |
| Lydinge Mølle | | Lydinge Mølle Vej 17, 5750 Ringe | | |
| Lydinge Mølle | | Lydinge Mølle Vej 17, 5750 Ringe | | |
| Lydinge Mølle | | Lydinge Mølle Vej 17, 5750 Ringe | | |
| Lydinge Mølle | | Lydinge Mølle Vej 17, 5750 Ringe | | |
| Lydinge Mølle | | Lydinge Mølle Vej 17, 5750 Ringe | | |
| Lydinge Mølle | | Lydinge Mølle Vej 17, 5750 Ringe | | |
| Rynkebygård | | Rynkebyvej 30, 5750 Ringe | | |
| Rynkebygård | | Rynkebyvej 32, 5750 Ringe | | |
| Rynkebygård | | Rynkebyvej 32, 5750 Ringe | | |
| Rynkebygård | | Rynkebyvej 34, 5750 Ringe | | |
| Sallingelunde Mølle | | Sallingelunde 10, 5750 Ringe | | |
| Sallingelunde Mølle | | Sallingelunde 10, 5750 Ringe | | |

=== 5772 Kværndrup ===
| Listing name | Image | Location | Coordinates | Description |
|---|---|---|---|---|
| Egeskov Castle | | Egeskov Gade 26, 5772 Kværndrup | 55°10′33.8″N 10°29′24.52″E | Renaissance-style main building from1554 |
| Egeskov Windmill | | Grønnebjergvej 1A, 5772 Kværndrup | 55°9′57.72″N 10°28′33.83″E | Windmill from 1855 |

=== 5792 Årslev ===
| Listing name | Image | Location | Coordinates | Description |
|---|---|---|---|---|
| Bramstrup | | Bramstrup 1, 5792 Årslev | | |
| Bramstrup | | Bramstrup 1, 5792 Årslev | | |
| Bramstrup | | Bramstrup 1, 5792 Årslev | | |
| Bramstrup | | Bramstrup 1, 5792 Årslev | | |
| Søbysøgård | | Søvej 27, 5792 Årslev | 55°17′23.51″N 10°2′1.22″E | Three-winged main building og which the central wing dates from 1641, the east wing dates from c. 1710 and the west wing dates from 1768 |
| Sønder-Nærå Præstegård | | Kirkevej 20, 5792 Årslev | | |

== Delisted buildings ==
| Listing name | Image | Location | Coordinates | Description |
|---|---|---|---|---|
| Adelgade 3 | | Adelgade 3, 5600 Faaborg | | |
