= Korinth, Denmark =

Korinth
- Village
- Location in Region of Southern Denmark Korinth (Denmark)
- Coordinates: 55°8′35″N 10°19′36″E
- Country: Denmark
- Region: Southern Denmark
- Municipality: Faaborg Midtfyn
- Parish: Brahetrolleborg Parish

Population (2026)
  - Total: 891

Korinth is a village, with a population of 891 (1 January 2026), in Faaborg-Midtfyn Municipality, Region of Southern Denmark in Denmark. It is situated on the island of Funen 10 km northeast of Faaborg, 14 km west of Kværndrup and 18 km southwest of Ringe.

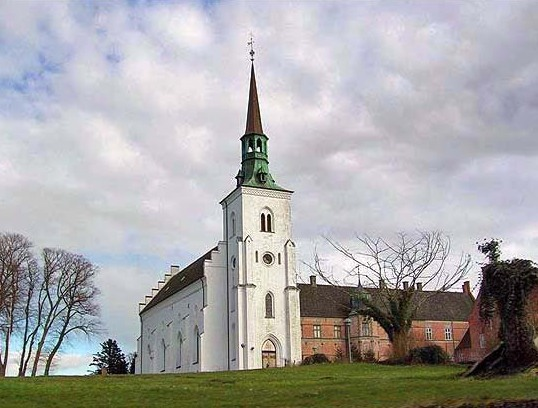
Brahetrolleborg Church

Korinth is a part of Brahetrolleborg Parish. The parish church, build 1250–1325 as the northern wing of Brahetrolleborg Castle, is located 1 km northeast of the village.

Arreskov Lake, the largest lake on Funen, is situated just northwest of Korinth.

== History ==
=== Korinth Kro ===
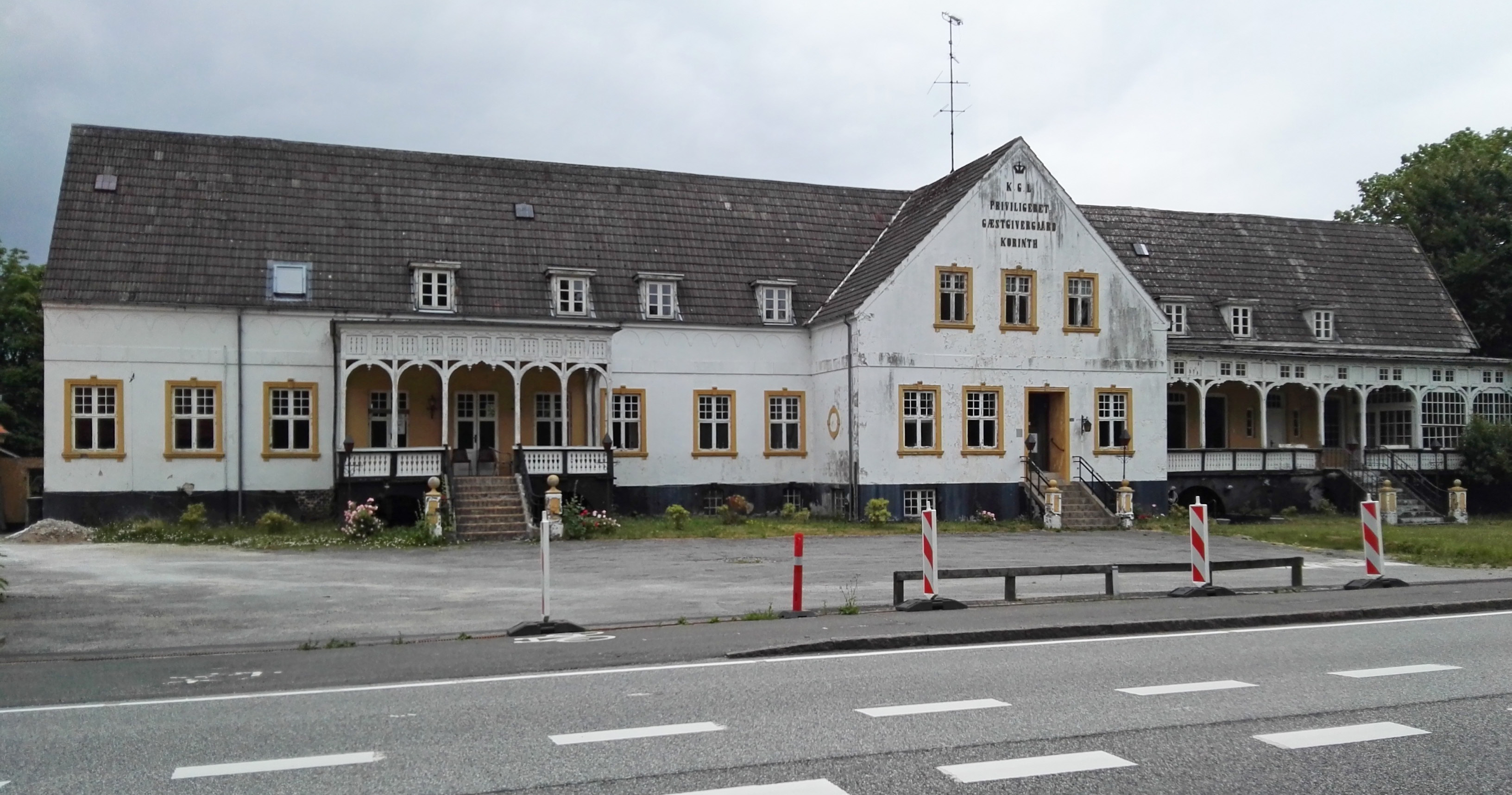
Korinth Kro (Korinth Inn) in 2018 before the most recent renovation of the building

Korinth Kro (Korinth Inn) is located on the northeastern outskirts of the village. The poet Jens Baggesen (1764–1826) and countess Sibille Reventlow rode through the parish, naming farms and estates. The plots in the area around the inn were given Greek names, and the inn was named Korinth after the Greek city of Corinth.

However, when the first building were erected in the 1780s, an inn was not what they had in mind, but rather a boarding and reform school for orphaned boys from Copenhagen.

Simon Hempel Plough, a merchant's son from Faaborg, renovated the building and was granted permission to run Korinth Kro as an inn in November 1801. In the following centuries, several proprietors have run Korinth Kro, but in 2009 it came to an end. After various attempts at selling the inn, it was decided to demolish it in 2016.

A local group of citizens started negotiating the take over of the inn with Faaborg-Midtfyn council, who was the owner at the time. After a legal tussle, the ownership was transferred to the non-profit organization, Korinth Kro Association. The association has been working ever since to safeguard and renovate the building and the adjacent stable

== Culture ==
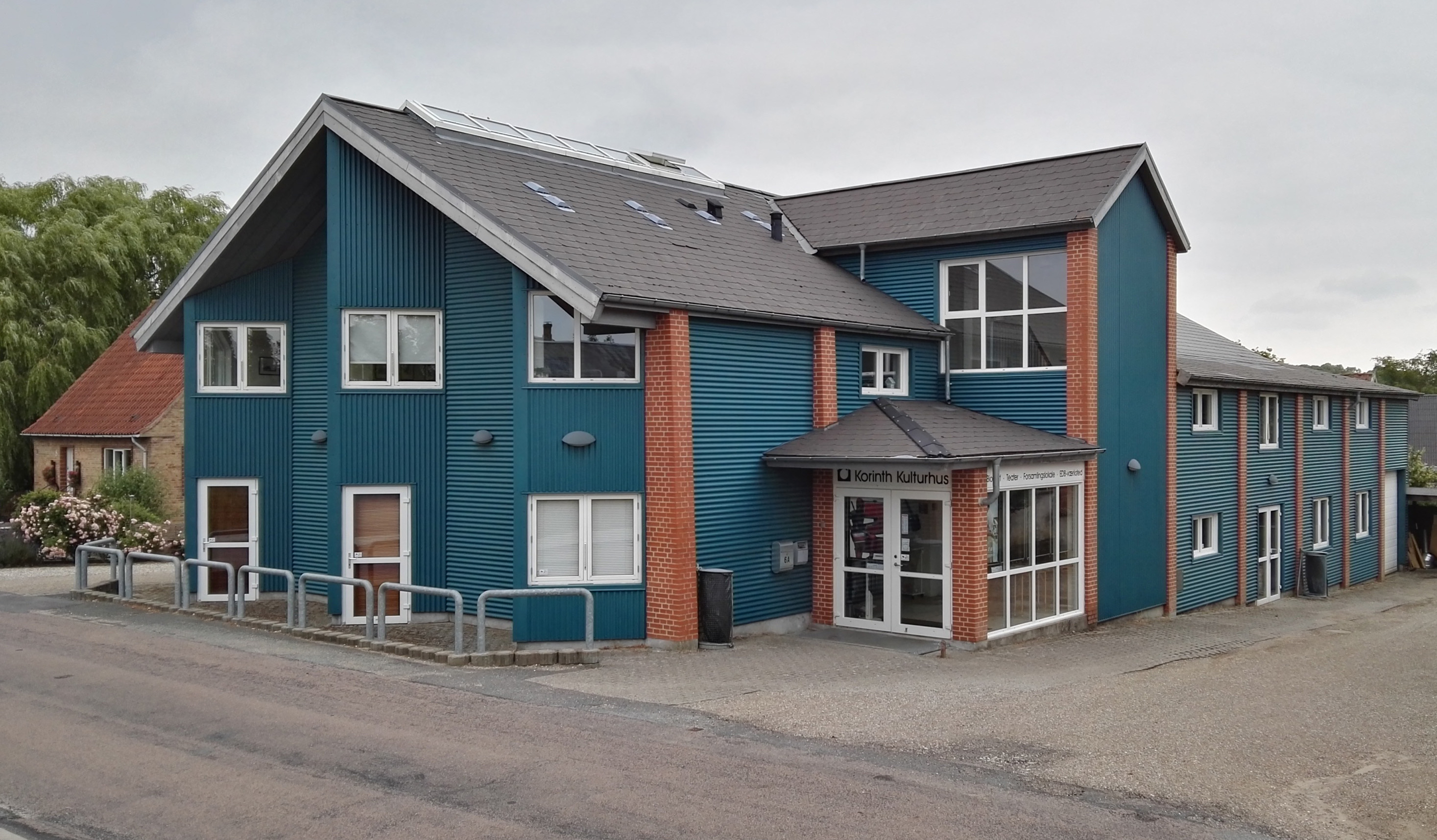
Korinth Kulturhus - the culture house

Korinth Kulturhus is a cinema and culture house located in the village.
