= Team Rynkeby =

Charity cycling team

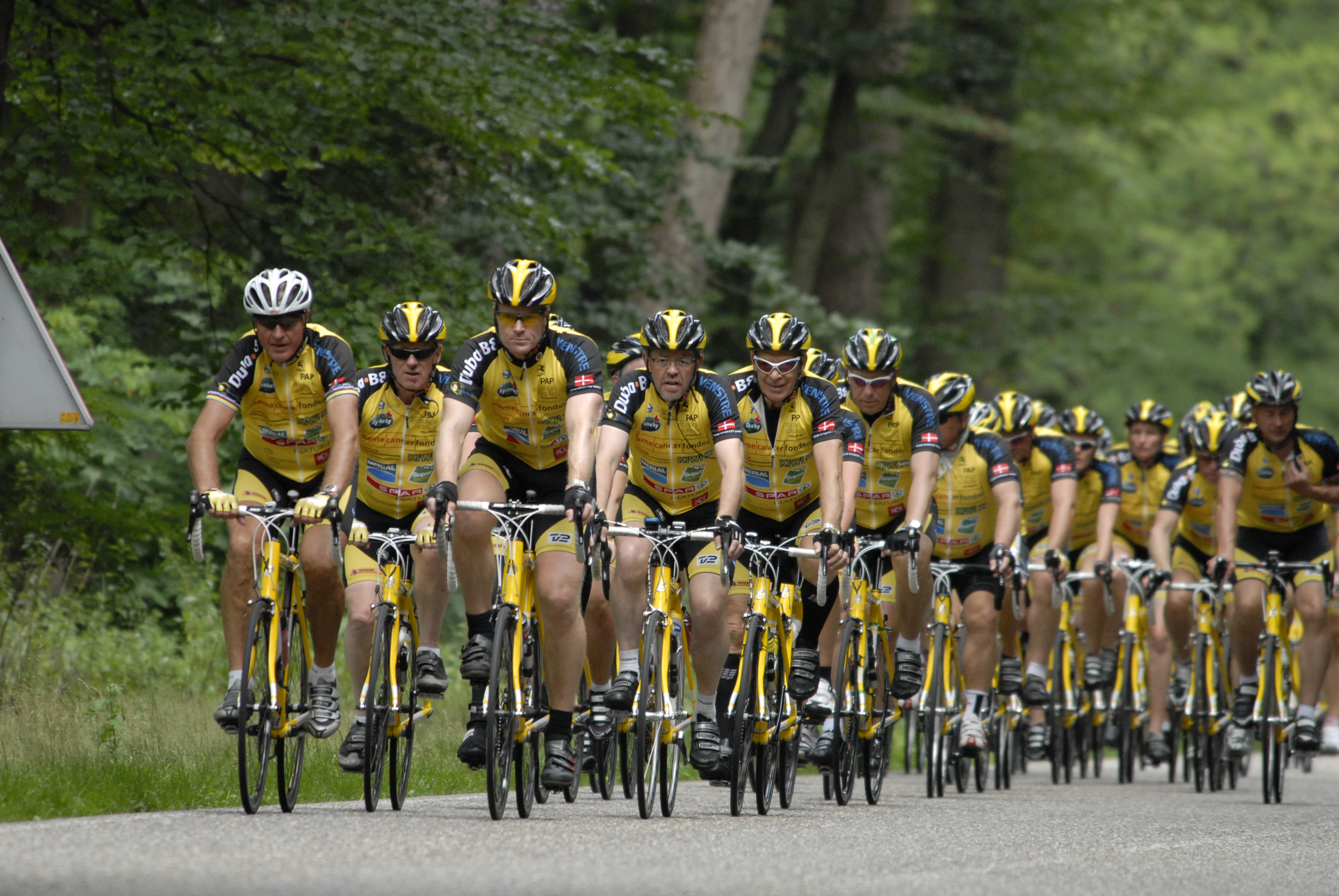
Team Rynkeby's 10th trip to Paris in 2011.

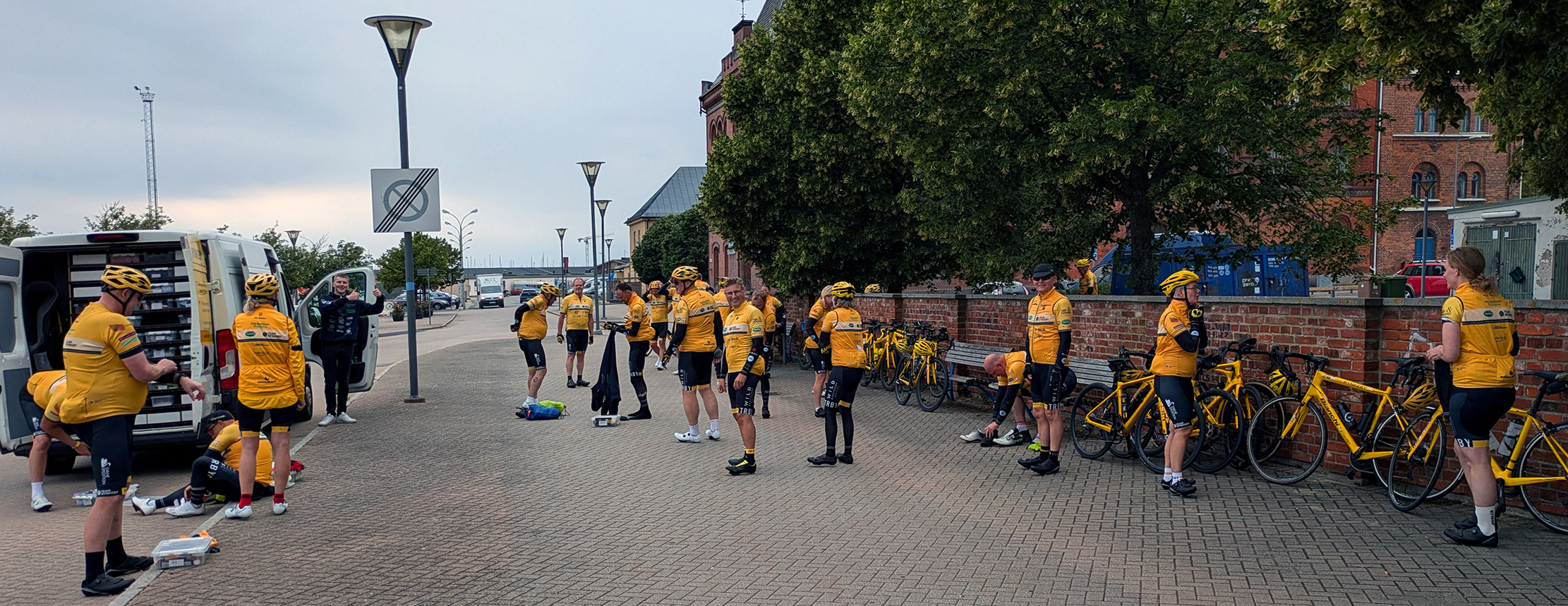
Team Rynkeby in Ystad prepares for departure to Trelleborg July 5, 2025.

Team Rynkeby is a European charity cycling project founded in 2002. It is run by the Team Rynkeby Foundation headquatered in Ringe, Denmark. The objective of this initiative is to raise funds and create awareness for children with critical illnesses.

Every season the participating teams set out for a cycling trip to Paris to raise money for relevant organizations in their home countries. Since the start of this project, Team Rynkeby has donated 112,983,300 euros (as of 2025) to affected children and their families in all countries represented.

In the past years numerous teams with thousands of participants and service helpers from Denmark, Sweden, Norway, Finland, Iceland, the Faroe Islands, Germany, Switzerland plus several mixed international teams actively joined the cause.

== Team Rynkeby's donations to the Foundations ==
- 2002: 5.111 EUR (11 riders)
- 2003: 13.450 EUR (15 riders)
- 2004: 23.242 EUR (15 riders)
- 2005: 23.444 EUR (21 riders)
- 2006: 32.739 EUR (21 riders)
- 2007: 60.527 EUR (41 riders)
- 2008: 195.032 EUR (155 riders on 4 Danish teams)
- 2009: 410.779 EUR (273 riders on 7 Danish teams)
- 2010: 634.865 EUR (311 riders on 8 Danish teams)
- 2011: 1.315 mio. EUR (584 riders on 11 Danish and two Swedish teams)
- 2012: 2,138,485 EUR (790 riders

Year	Amount EUR	No. of participants	No. of teams	Participating countries
2002	5,111	11	1	Denmark
2003	13,450	15	1	Denmark
2004	23,100	15	1	Denmark
2005	23,300	21	1	Denmark
2006	32,600	21	1	Denmark
2007	60,300	41	1	Denmark
2008	194,400	155	4	Denmark
2009	409,400	273	7	Denmark
2010	632,700	311	8	Denmark
2011	1,301,700	284	13	Denmark + Sweden
2012	2,138,485	790	17	Denmark, Sweden
2013	3,049,588	985	21	Denmark, Sweden + Finland
2014	4,839,560	1150	26	Denmark, Sweden, Finland + Norway + Faroe Islands + Australia
2015	6,499,124	1400	32	Denmark, Sweden, Finland, Norway, Faroe Islands
2016	8,840,002	1500	38	Denmark, Sweden, Finland, Norway, Faroe Islands
2017	8,750,942	1700	44	Denmark, Sweden, Finland, Norway, Faroe Islands + Iceland
2018	9,441,283	1900	48	Denmark, Sweden, Finland, Norway, Faroe Islands, Iceland
2019	10,633,754	2000	54	Denmark, Sweden, Finland, Norway, Faroe Islands, Iceland + Germany
2020	8,799,175	2150	57	Denmark, Sweden, Finland, Norway, Faroe Islands, Iceland, Germany + International team + Switzerland
2021	9,741,679	2400	59	Denmark, Sweden, Finland, Norway, Faroe Islands, Iceland, Germany, International team, Switzerland
2022	10,476,148	2024	62	Denmark, Sweden, Finland, Norway, Faroe Islands, Iceland, Germany, International team, Switzerland + Belgium
2023	9,179,523	1958	65	Denmark, Sweden, Finland, Norway, Faroe Islands, Iceland, Germany, International team, Switzerland, Belgium
2024	8,683,568	2056	66	Denmark, Sweden, Finland, Norway, Faroe Islands, Iceland, Germany, International team, Switzerland
2025	9,264,469	2701	69	Denmark, Sweden, Finland, Norway, Faroe Islands, Iceland, Germany, International team, Switzerland
2026	9,800,482	2803	73	Denmark, Sweden, Finland, Norway, Faroe Islands, Iceland, Germany, International team, Switzerland
