= Brobyværk =

- Town
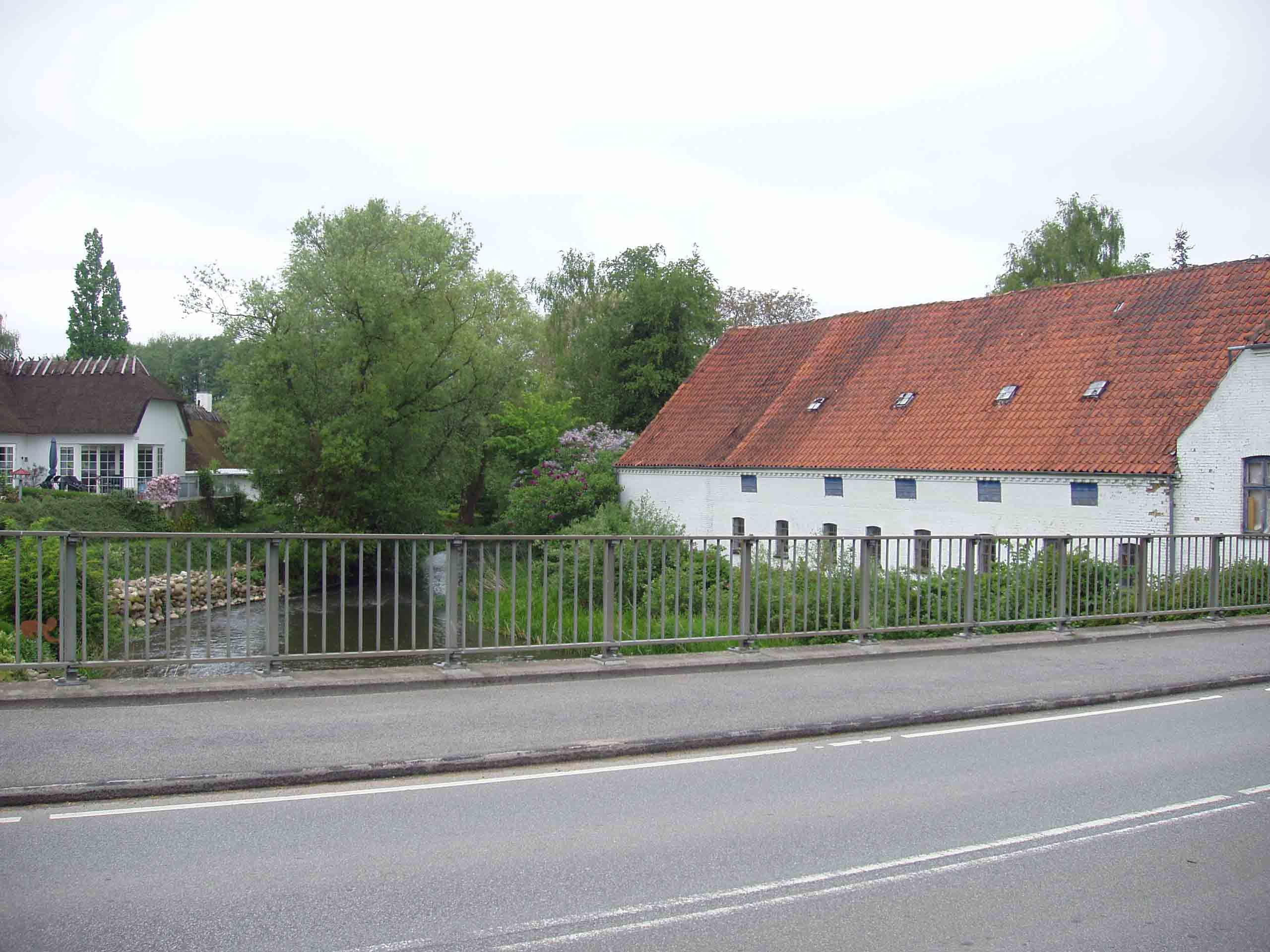
- Odense Å in Brobyværk

- Location in Region of Southern Denmark Brobyværk (Denmark)
- Coordinates: 55°13′44″N 10°15′32″E
- Country: Denmark
- Region: Southern Denmark
- Municipality: Faaborg-Midtfyn
- Parish: Sønder Broby Parish

Area
  - Urban: 1 km^{2} (0.39 sq mi)

Population (2026)
  - Urban: 1,047
  - Urban density: 1,000/km^{2} (2,700/sq mi)
- Time zone: UTC+1 (CET)
  - Summer (DST): UTC+2 (CEST)
- Postal code: DK-5672 Broby

Brobyværk or Sønder Broby is a small town, with a population of 1,047 (1 January 2026), in Faaborg-Midtfyn Municipality, Region of Southern Denmark in Denmark.

Brobyværk is situated on the island of Funen 24 km southwest of Odense, 3 km southeast of Nørre Broby, 17 km north of Faaborg and 16 km west of Ringe.

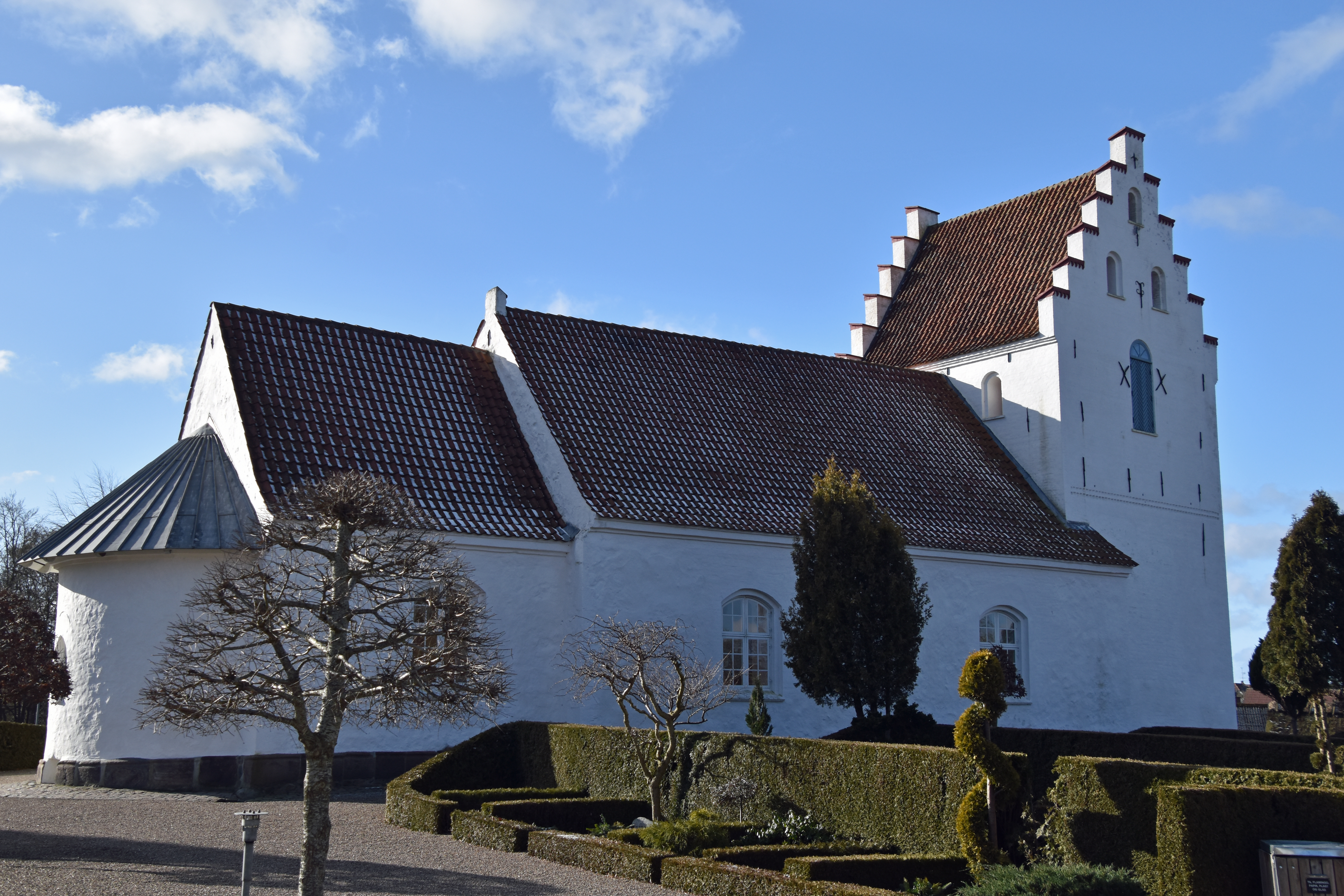
Sønder Broby Church

The town consist of two parts divided by the stream of Odense Å. The eastern part of the town, the original village where the church is located, is called Sønder Broby and the western part, where the inn is located, is called Brobyværk.

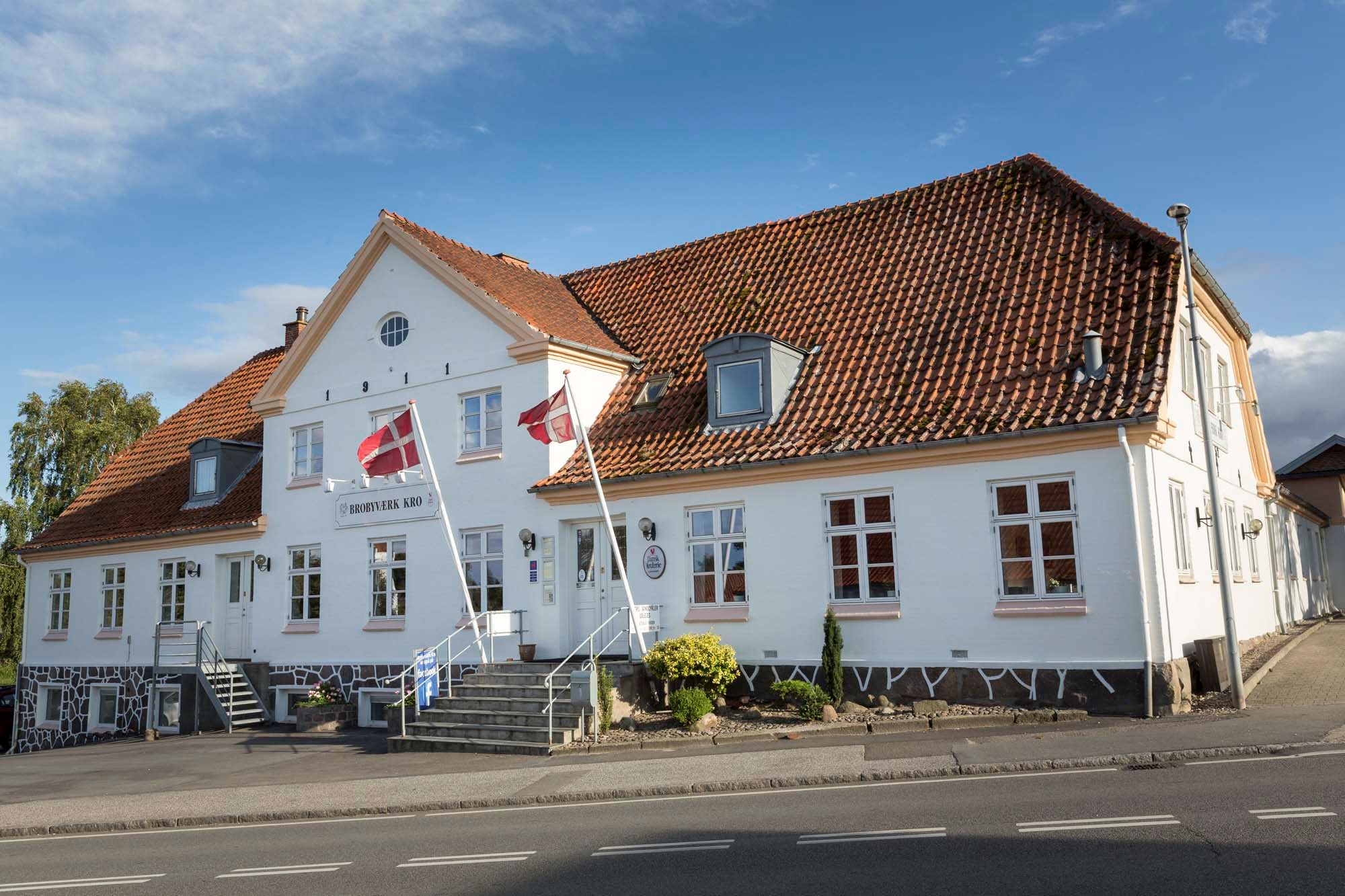
Brobyværk Kro (Brobyværk Inn)

Brobyværk Kro (Brobyværk Inn) is a historical inn dating back to 1645. It is situated where the road to Assens and the old road between Odense and Faaborg crosses Odense Å.
