= Tribondeau =

Tribondeau is a surname. Notable people with the surname include:

- Luca Tribondeau (born 1996), Austrian skier
- Thierry Tribondeau (born 1962), French bobsledder
