= Ø-Færgen =

Danish ferry company

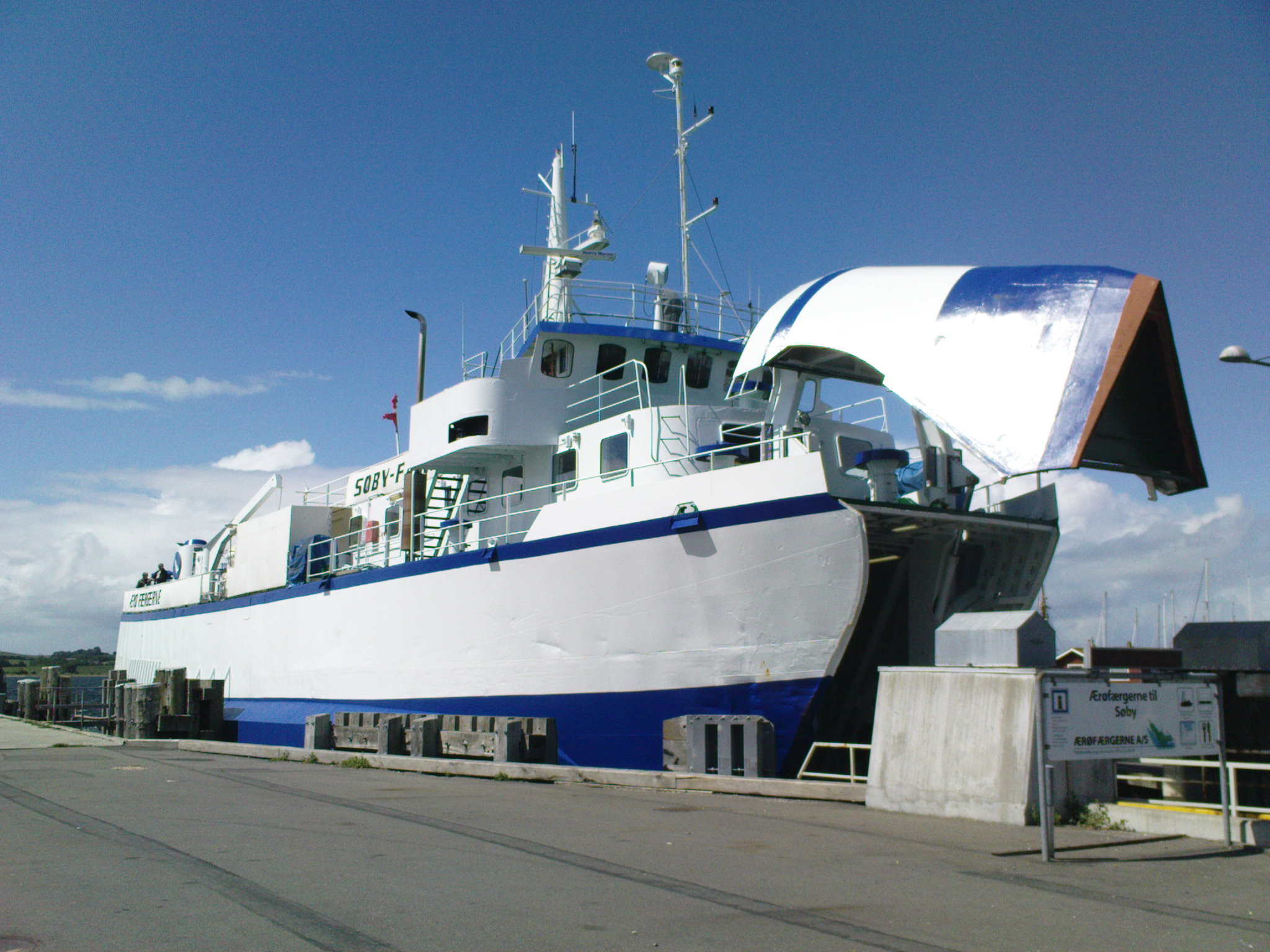
M/S Faaborg III

Ø-Færgen is a Danish ferry company that operates a single ferry, M/S Faaborg III, between Faaborg Harbour and the small islands of Avernakø and Lyø in the South Funen Archipelago.
