= Ryslinge Folk High School =

Danish folk school

Coordinates: 55°14′33″N 10°32′23″E

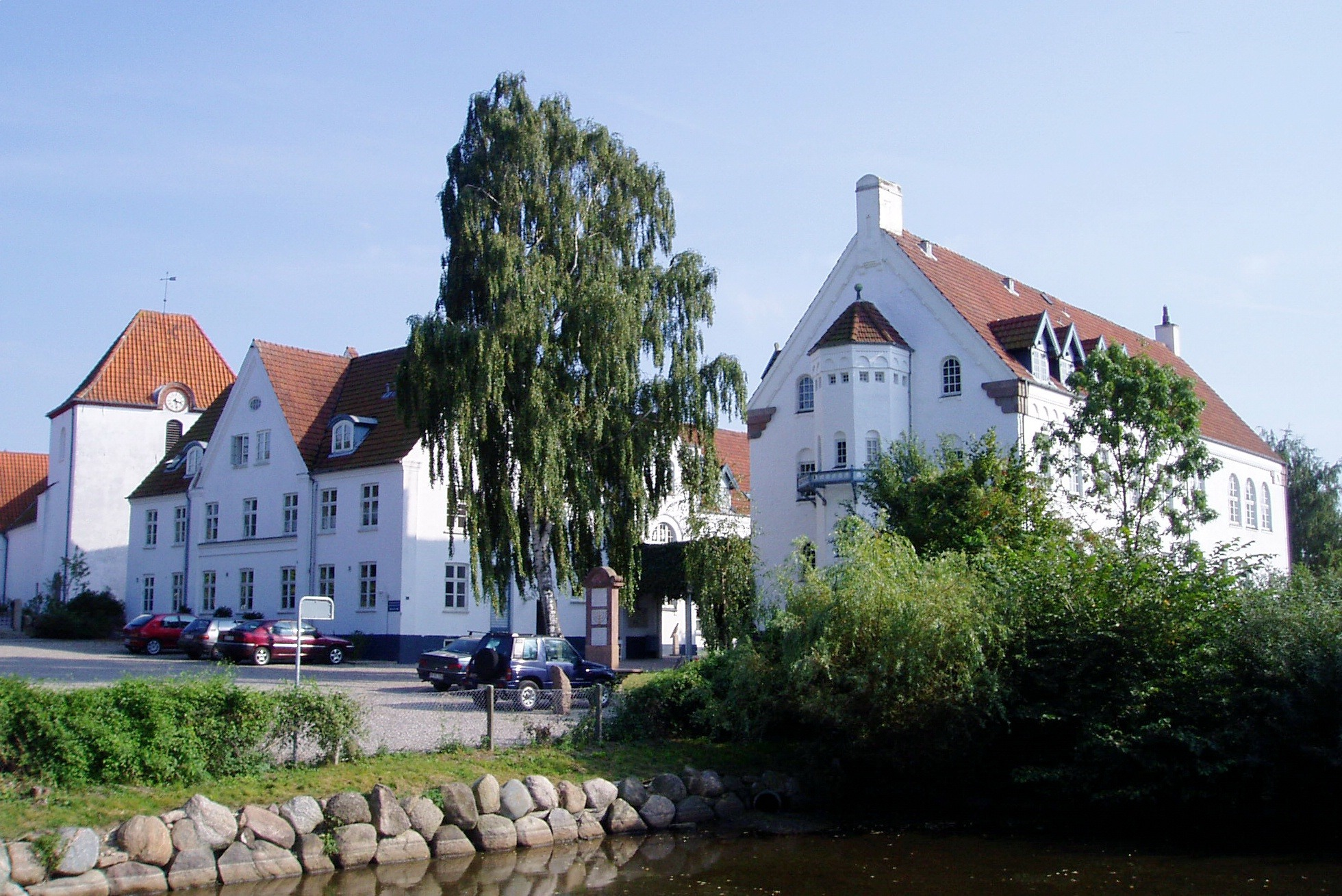
Ryslinge Folk High School (2005)

Ryslinge Folk High School (Danish: Ryslinge Højskole) is a folk high school in the village of Ryslinge on the Danish island Funen.

== History ==
It was founded in 1851 by Christen Mikkelsen Kold (1816-1870) and was one of the first folk high schools in the world. Kold and Anders Christian Poulsen Dal (1826-99) were the first teachers. The college became a center for public education and general education. The high school has a focus on theater, acting and performing arts.
