= Odense River =

Coordinates: 55°26′13.02″N 10°25′21.95″E

Odense Å
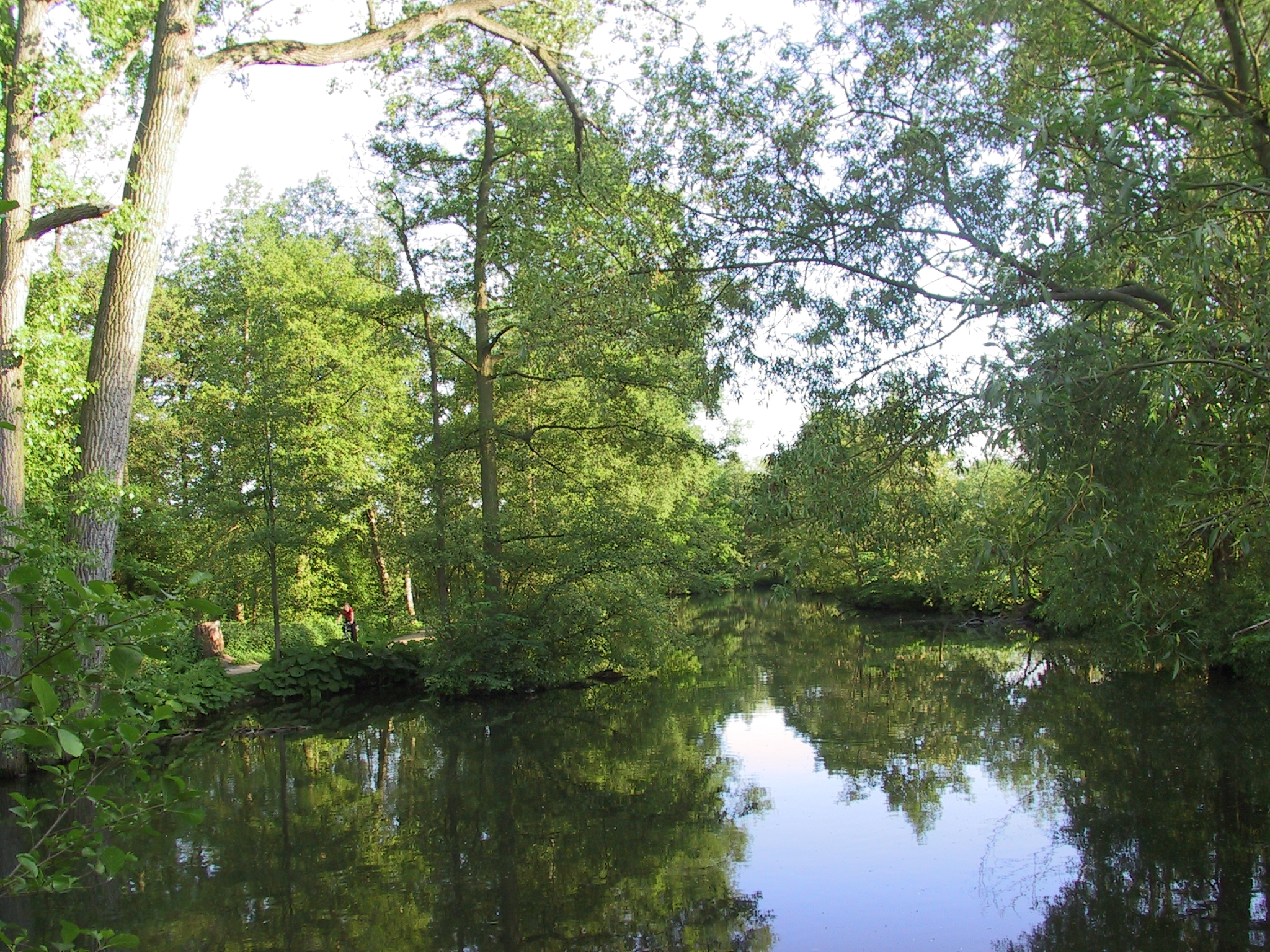
- Odense River

Location
- Country: Denmark

Physical characteristics
- Source
  - location: Lake Arreskov near Korinth
- Mouth
  - location: Odense Fjord between Stige and Seden
- Length: about 60 kilometres (37 mi)

The Odense River (Danish: Odense Å) is a river located on the island of Funen, in central Denmark. It is about 60 kilometres (37 mi) long and is named after the Funish capital, Odense, which it passes through. Boats can be rented by the river, offering a scenic ride to Fruens Bøge. Excursion boats offer rides to Carlslund, with jazz music some Saturdays during the Summer.

During the Viking Age, the fortress Nonnebakken ensured its controller supremacy over the river.
