= Aksel Bender Madsen =

Danish furniture designer

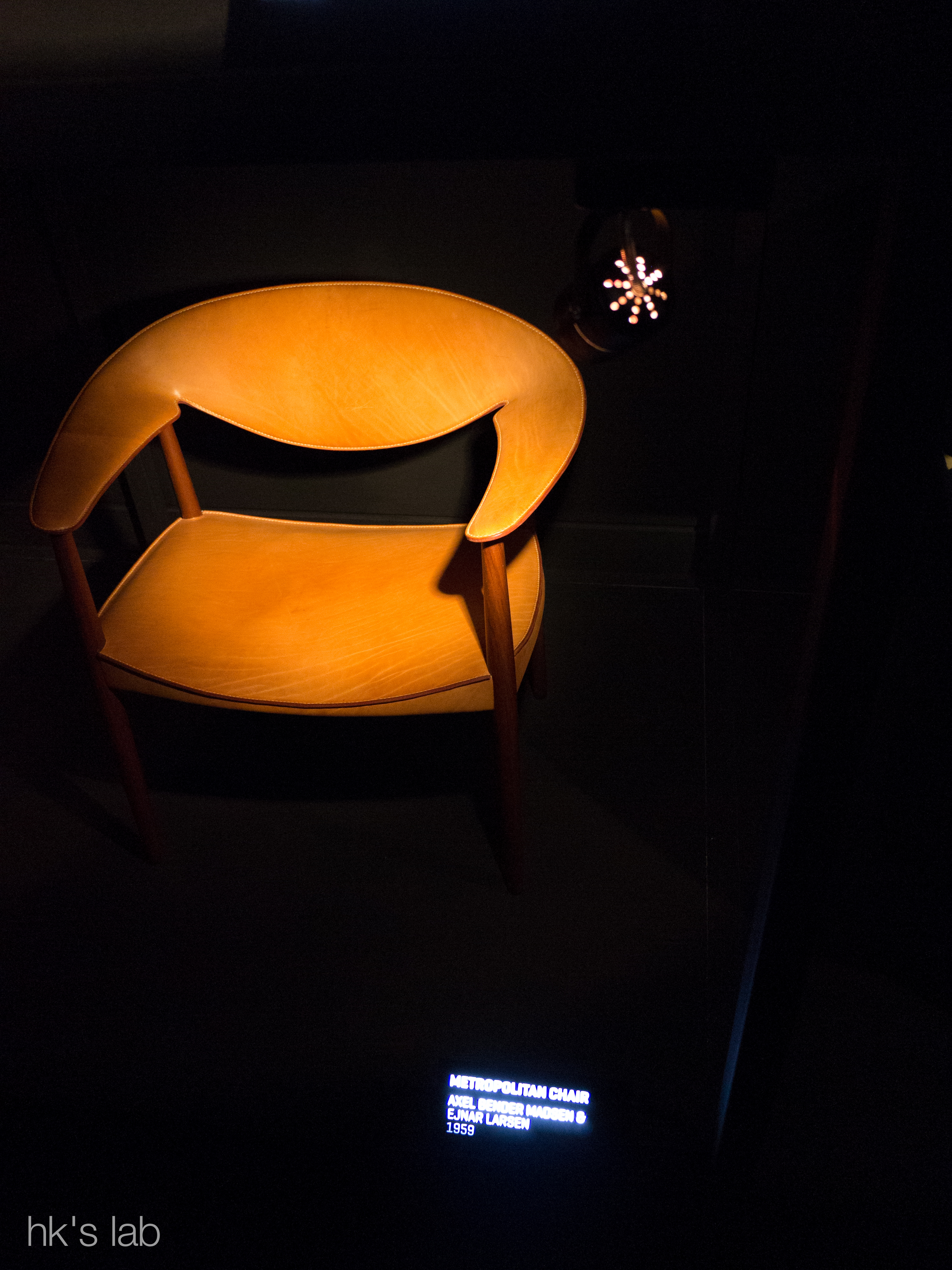
Metropolitan chair designed in 1959 by Ejnar Larsen and Aksel Bender Madsen

Aksel Bender Madsen (16 August 1916 – 23 May 2000) was a Danish furniture designer who worked closely together with Ejner Larsen (1917-1987) producing a wide variety of items during the Danish modern period.

== Biography ==
Born in Ringe on the Danish island of Funen, Madsen was the son of farmer Niels Martin Madsen and his wife Karen Marie f. Andersen. After training as a cabinetmaker, he attended the Furniture School at the Royal Danish Academy of Fine Arts, graduating in 1940. Thereafter he worked with architects Kaare Klint and Arne Jacobsen until 1943.

From 1942, he designed his own models which he exhibited at the annual exhibition of the Copenhagen Cabinetmakers Guild (Københavns Snedkerlaug). While studying at the Academy, he met Ejner Larsen who became his partner. In 1947, they established a design studio together. The same year, they presented works made by cabinetmaker Willy Beck at the Copenhagen Cabinetmakers Guild's exhibition where they continued to participate year after year, working with Beck for a total of 25 years. Aksel Bender Madsen received the Cabinetmakers Guild annual prize (Snedkerprisen) in 1956 and 1961.

In addition to sculptural chair designs, they also designed living rooms, bedrooms, shelving, dining tables, and office furniture. Their most notable work is the Metropolitan Chair, in bent plywood, which was exhibited in 1949 and manufactured by Fritz Hansen from 1952. All their works have a clear, timeless, simple style which continues to please today.

In Madsen's own words: "What Ejner Larsen and I have made has always been in line with the principles we learnt from Kaare Klint about what is functional and what is natural. The requirements made set the design."

Madsen also taught at the Danish Design School (Danmarks Designskole) in Copenhagen from 1946 to 1954.

== Personal life ==
He was married in 1943 to Ruth M. Jakobsen (b. 1920).

== See also ==
- Danish modern
- Danish design
