= Arreskov Lake =

Lake in Funen, Denmark

- Location within Denmark
- Location: Denmark
- Coordinates: 55°09′30″N 10°18′27″E
- Surface area: 3.17 km^{2} (1.22 sq mi)
- Average depth: 1.9 m (6 ft 3 in)

Arreskov Lake (Danish: Arreskov Sø) is the largest lake on the island of Funen, Denmark.

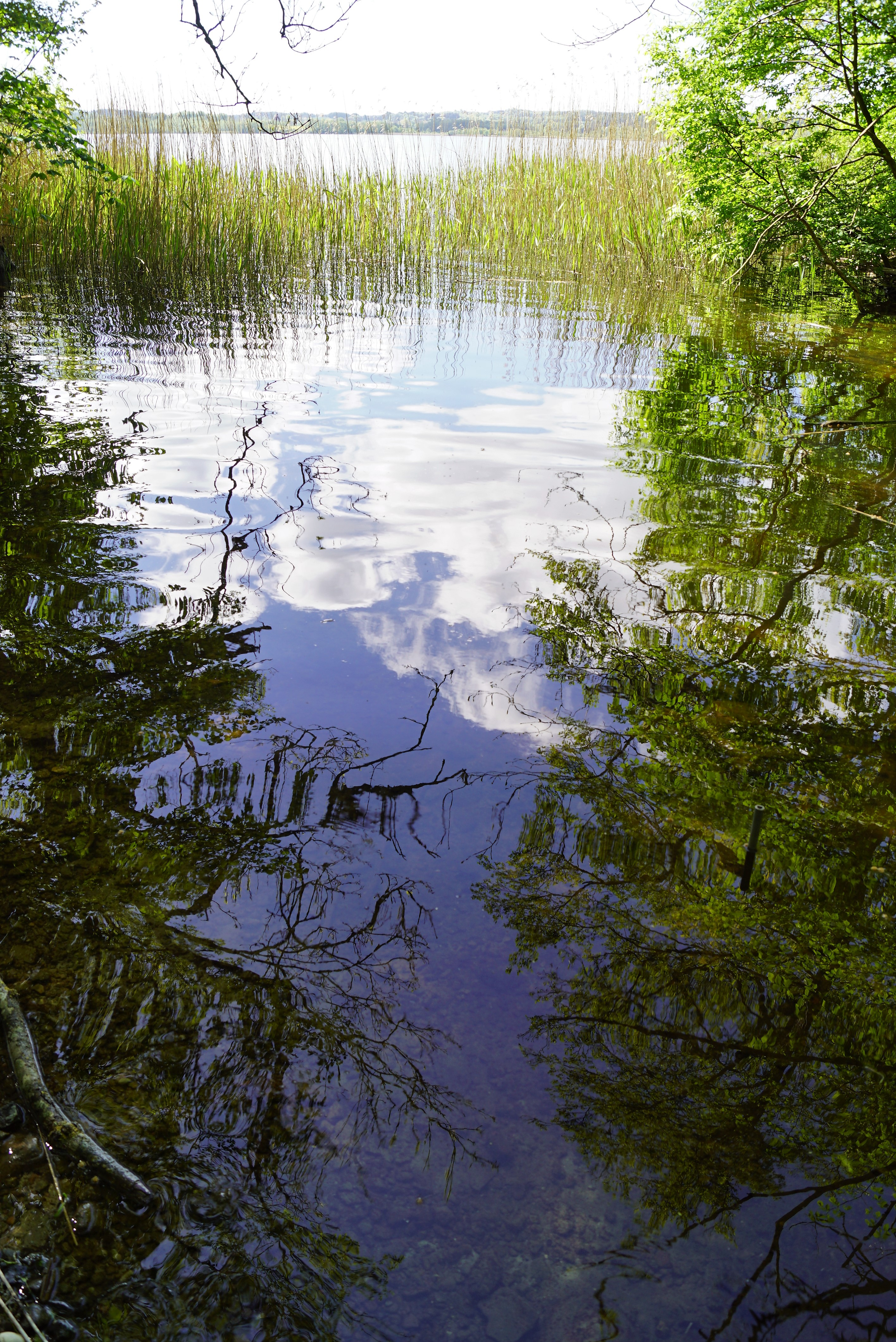
The beginning of Odense Å at the eastern shore of the lake

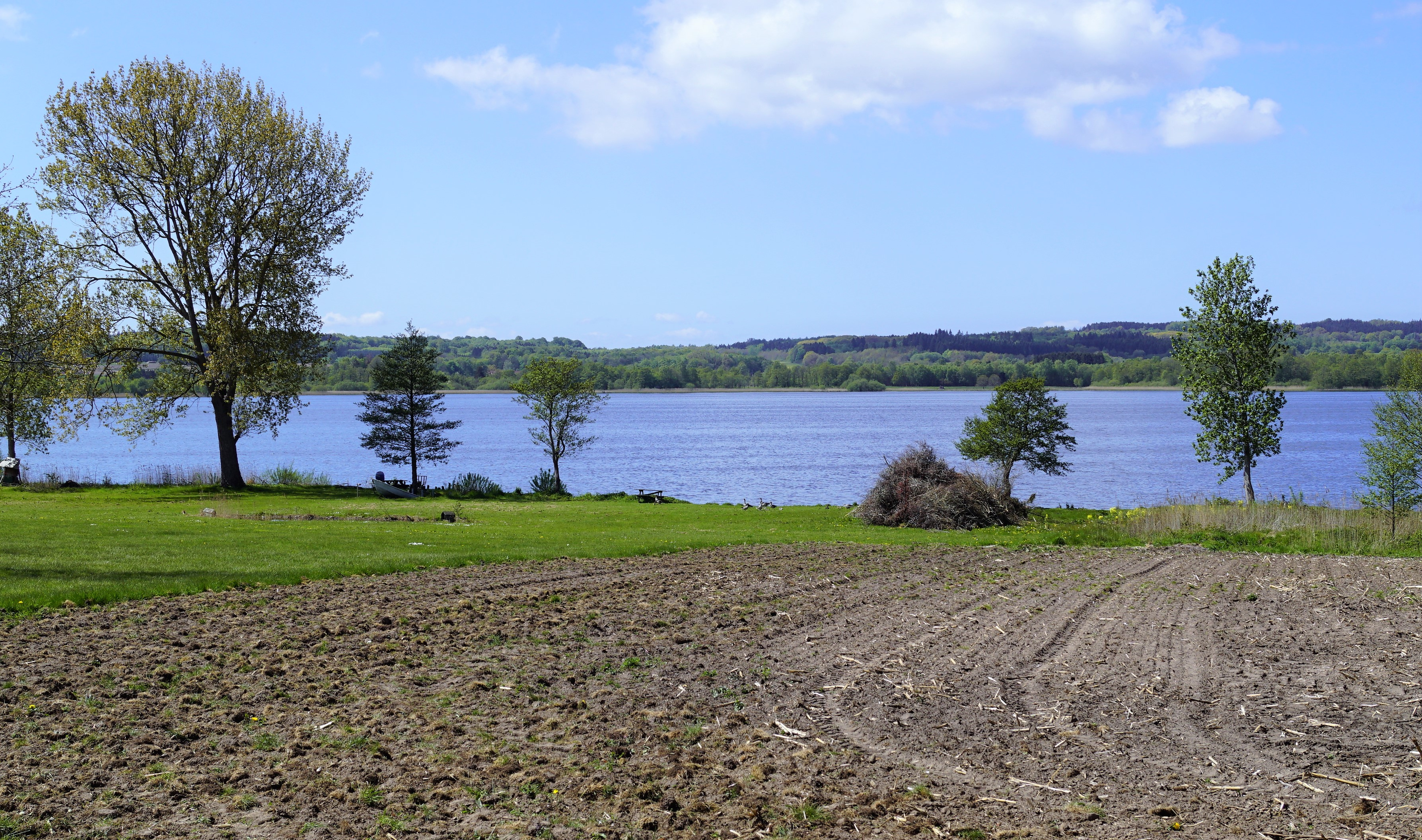
The lake, seen from the east

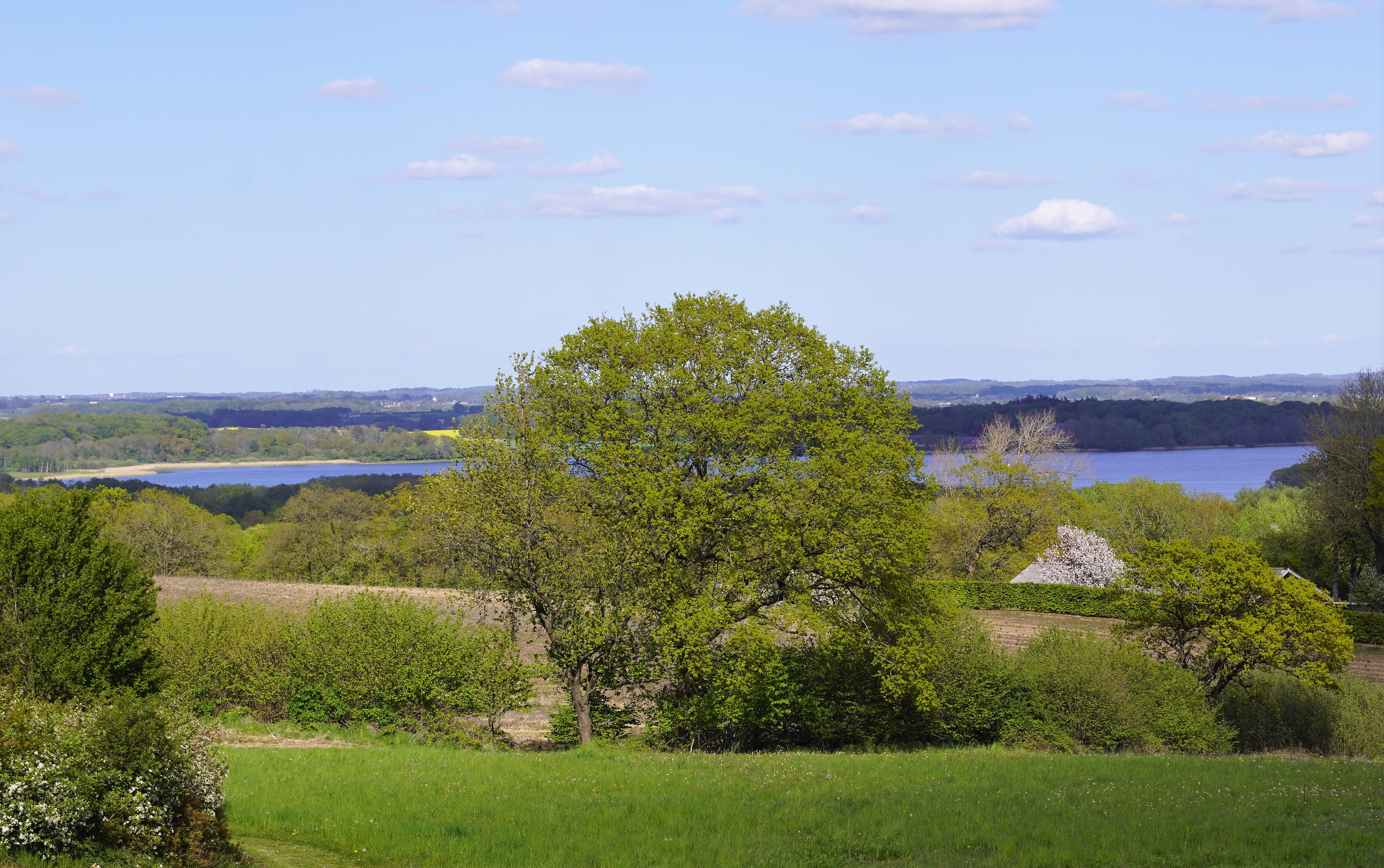
The lake, seen from the west

== See also ==
- List of lakes in Denmark
