= Millinge =

Chinese noodle dish

Millinge is a Chinese noodle dish, popular in northern China. It is served with chopped chicken, pork, tomatoes, baby sweetcorn, and sauce. It is usually consumed during the Taoist holiday Procession of the Master, celebrated on the seventh day of seventh month.
