= Lyø =

Lyø Island
- Island
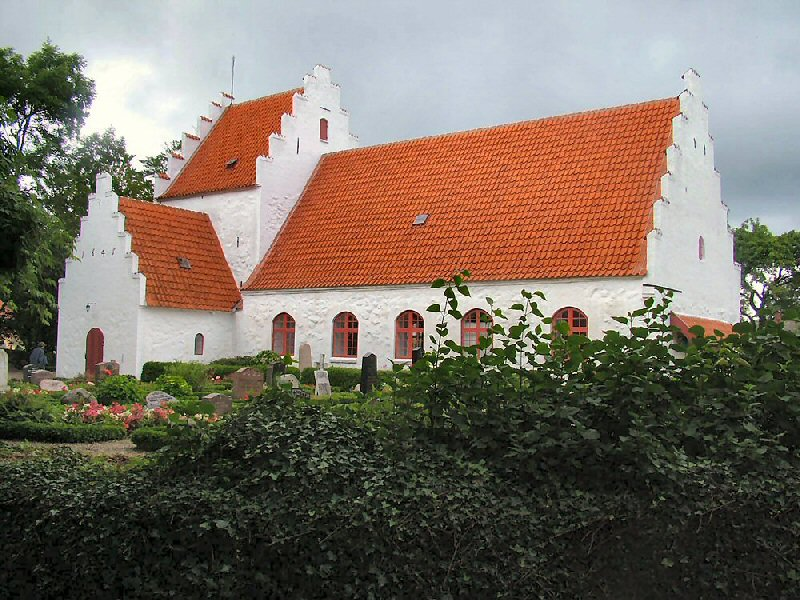
- Lyø Church

- Drejø is north of Ærø (bottom left)
- Coordinates: 55°2′0″N 10°10′0″E
- Country: Denmark
- Municipality: Faaborg-Midtfyn Municipality

Area
  - Total: 6.05 km^{2} (2.34 sq mi)

Population (2023)
  - Total: 81
  - Density: 13/km^{2} (35/sq mi)
- Time zone: UTC+1 (CET)
  - Summer (DST): UTC+2 (CEST)
- Postal codes: 5601
- Website: www.xn--ly-mka.dk/besg-ly

Lyø is one of the islands of the South Funen Archipelago, located south of the larger island of Funen, in southern Denmark. It covers an area of 6 km^{2} (2.3 sq mi) and has 81 inhabitants. The island can be reached by ferry from Faaborg and Avernakø. Administratively, the island belongs to Faaborg-Midtfyn Municipality .

== Lyø Village ==
Lyø Village is located in the centre of the island. The setting is dominated by old farmhouses, large trees and low stone walls, surrounding five ponds (originally 12). Lyø Church dates from about 1600 and is a typical Danish village church, white-washed and with a red tile roof.

== Harbour ==
The small harbour is located approximately 1 kilometre from the village. It consists of a ferry dock and a marina. Ø-Færgen operates a ferry between Faaborg on Funen, Avernakkeø and Lyø.

== See also ==
- List of islands of Denmark
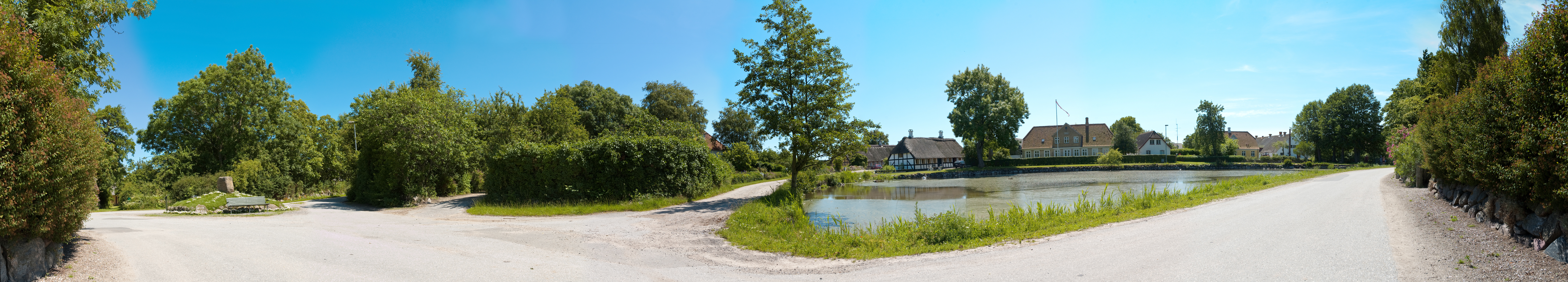
Panoramic view of Lyø Bygade
