= Thierry Tribondeau =

French bobsledder and athlete

Thierry Tribondeau (born 15 April 1962 in Ringe, Denmark) is a French bobsledder who competed in the early 1990s. Competing in two Winter Olympics, he earned his best finish of eighth in the four-man event at Albertville in 1992. He was born in Denmark to French refugees.

Prior to being in bobsleigh, Tibondeau was involved in track and field, being twice national champion in the 200 metres sprints in the late 1980s.
