= Avernakø =

Danish island

Coordinates: 55°01′N 10°17′E

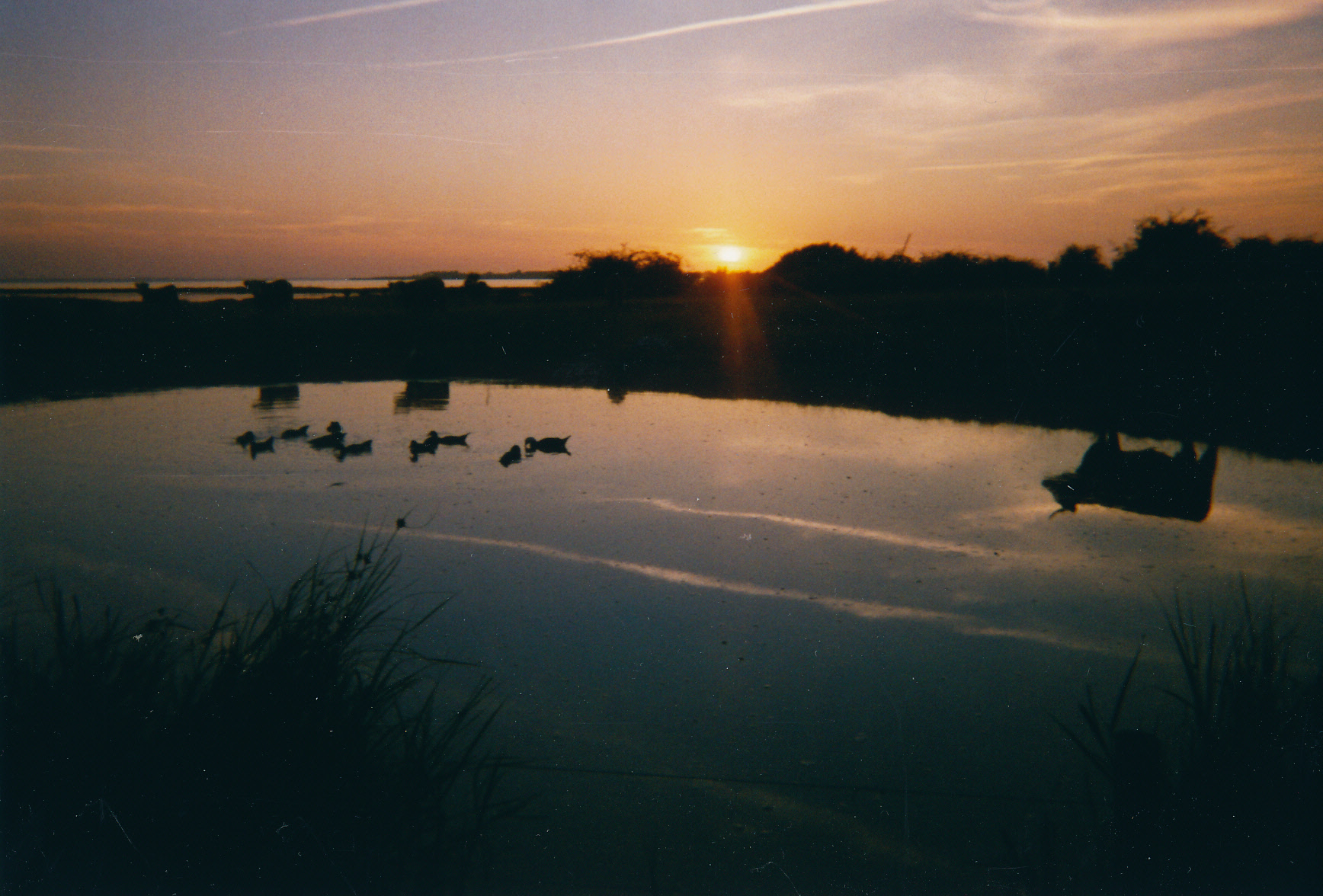
Avernakø

Avernakø is a Danish island south of Funen. The island covers an area of 6 km^{2} and has about 100 inhabitants.

Originally, Avernakø was two separate islands, "Korshavn" and "Avernak". In 1937 the two islands were connected by a dam named "Drejet" ("The Turn"), due to its peculiar shape.

Main occupations are agriculture and tourism. Children attend the school at the nearby island Lyø.

== Ferry ==
Ø-Færgen operates a ferry between Faaborg, Avernakø and Lyø (crossing time is 30 and 70 minutes respectively).
