= Ryslinge =

- Town
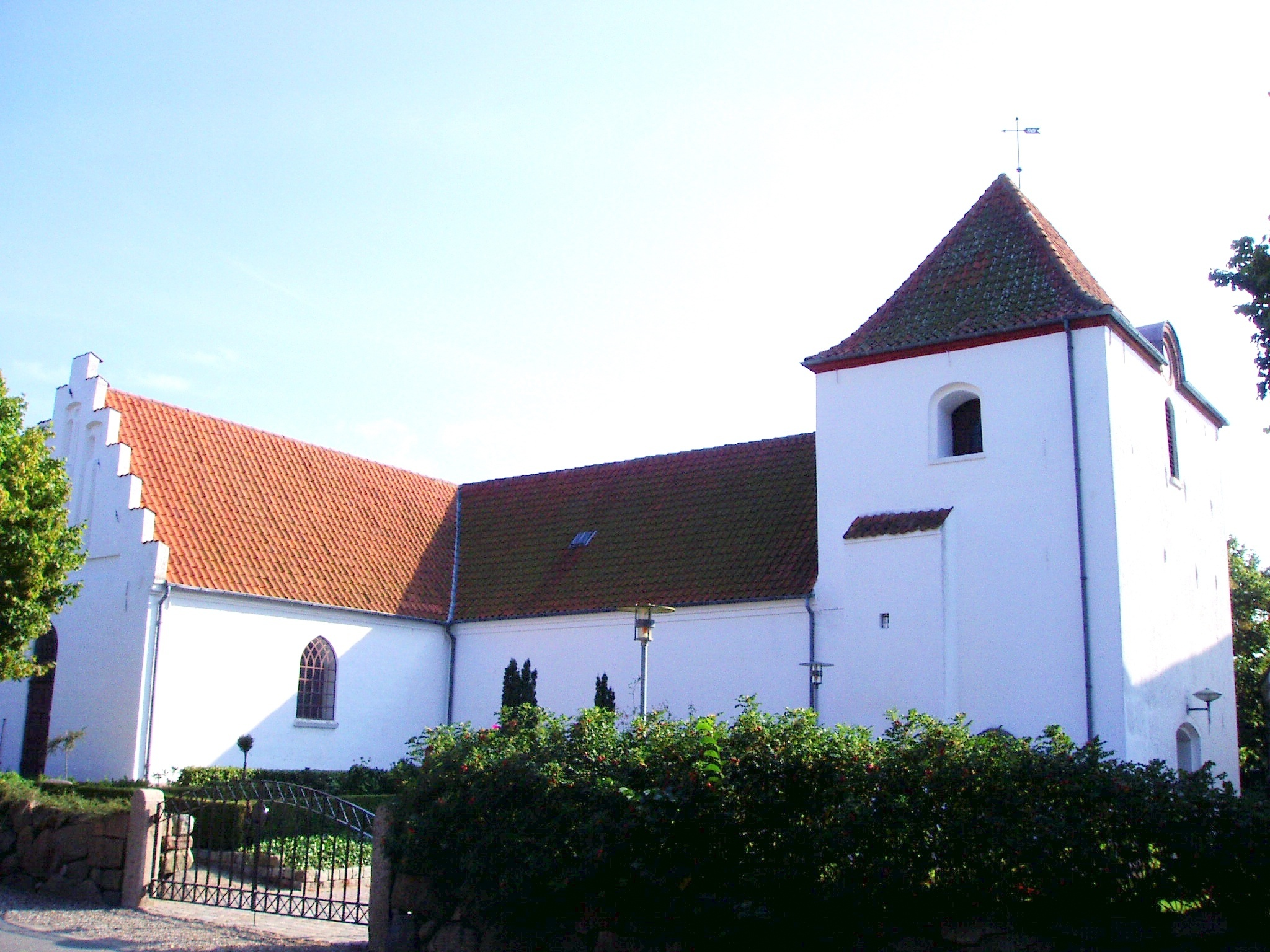
- Ryslinge Church

- Location in Region of Southern Denmark Ryslinge (Denmark)
- Coordinates: 55.24261°N 10.54052°E
- Country: Denmark
- Region: Southern Denmark
- Municipality: Faaborg-Midtfyn

Area
  - Urban: 1.5 km^{2} (0.58 sq mi)

Population (2026)
  - Urban: 2,009
  - Urban density: 1,300/km^{2} (3,500/sq mi)
- Time zone: UTC+1 (CET)
  - Summer (DST): UTC+2 (CEST)
- Postal code: DK-5856 Ryslinge

Ryslinge is a town with a population of 2,009 (1 January 2026) in central Denmark, located in Faaborg-Midtfyn Municipality on the island of Funen.

Ryslinge Folk High School is located in the town.
