= Årslev =

- Town
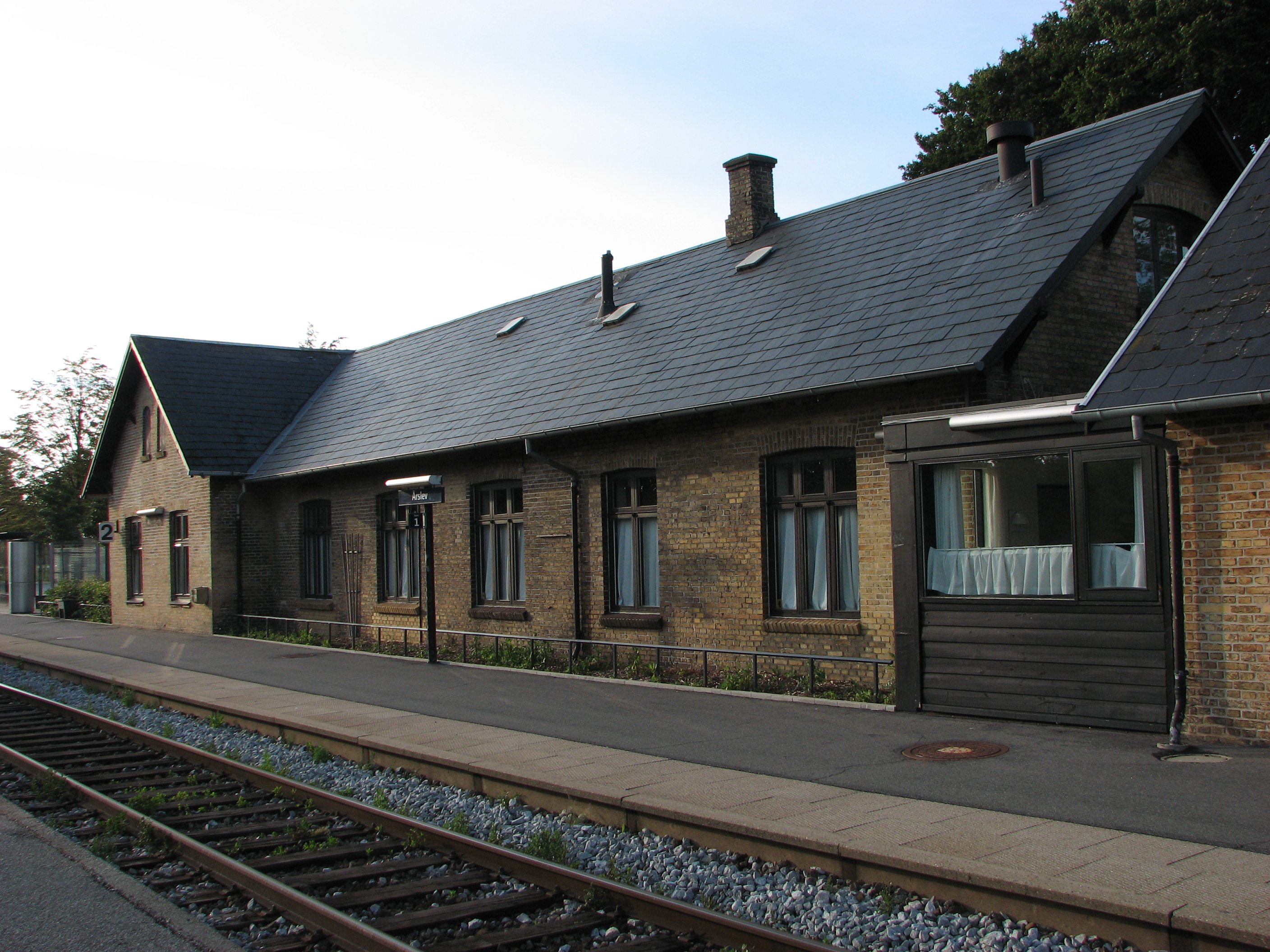
- Årslev railroad station

- Location in Denmark Årslev (Region of Southern Denmark)
- Coordinates: 55°18′15″N 10°28′15″E
- Country: Denmark
- Region: Southern Denmark
- Municipality: Faaborg-Midtfyn

Area
  - Urban: 3 km^{2} (1.2 sq mi)

Population (2026)
  - Urban: 4,427
  - Urban density: 1,500/km^{2} (3,800/sq mi)
  - Gender: 2,154 males and 2,273 females
- Time zone: UTC+1 (CET)
  - Summer (DST): UTC+2 (CEST)
- Postal code: DK-5792 Årslev

Årslev is a town in central Denmark on the island of Funen. It was located in Årslev Municipality, until 1 January 2007 when it became part of Faaborg-Midtfyn Municipality. The town has a population of 4,427 (1 January 2026).

There is a train station (operated by DSB) and bus connections (operated by Fynbus) to Odense and Svendborg. It has two schools, which are called Sdr. Nærå Fri- og Efterskole and Broskolen Afd. Bøgehøj

== Notable people ==
- Valdemar Skjerning (1887 in Palleshave, Årslev Municipality – 1970) a Danish stage and film actor
- Stine Nielsen (born 1991 in Årslev) a Danish sports shooter. She competed at the 2012 Summer Olympics
- Alexander Bah, footballer
