= Nørre Broby =

- Town
- Location in the Region of Southern Denmark
- Coordinates: 55°15′12″N 10°13′16″E
- Country: Denmark
- Region: Southern Denmark
- Municipality: Faaborg-Midtfyn Municipality

Area
  - Urban: 1.4 km^{2} (0.54 sq mi)

Population (2026)
  - Urban: 1,442
  - Urban density: 1,000/km^{2} (2,700/sq mi)
- Time zone: UTC+1 (CET)
  - Summer (DST): UTC+2 (CEST)

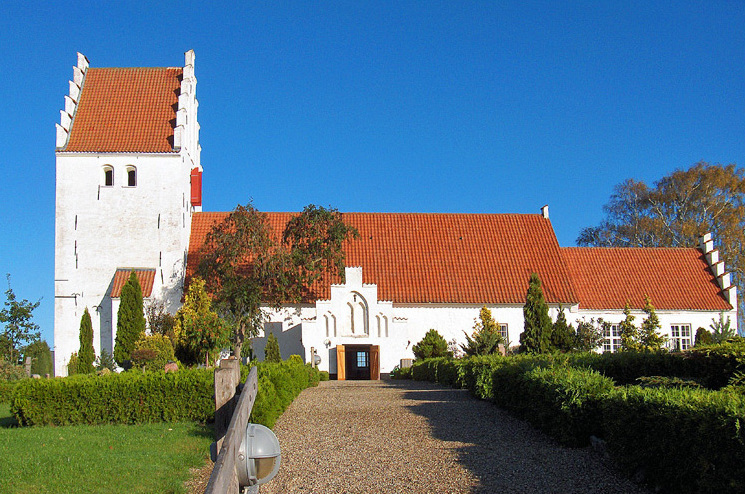
Nørre Broby Church

Nørre Broby, or simply Broby, is a small town in southwest-central Funen, Denmark, to the northeast of Haarby. It was the seat of Broby Municipality between 1970 and 2006 until the municipality was dissolved and merged with Faaborg-Midtfyn Municipality. 1 January 2026 it had a population of 1,442.

Nørre Broby Church, dated to around 1100, is located in the town. It also contains the Broby Library. The area has a history of clover production, going back to at least 1785.

== Notable people ==
- Maja Jager, archer, competed at the 2012 Summer Olympics
