= Kværndrup =

- Town
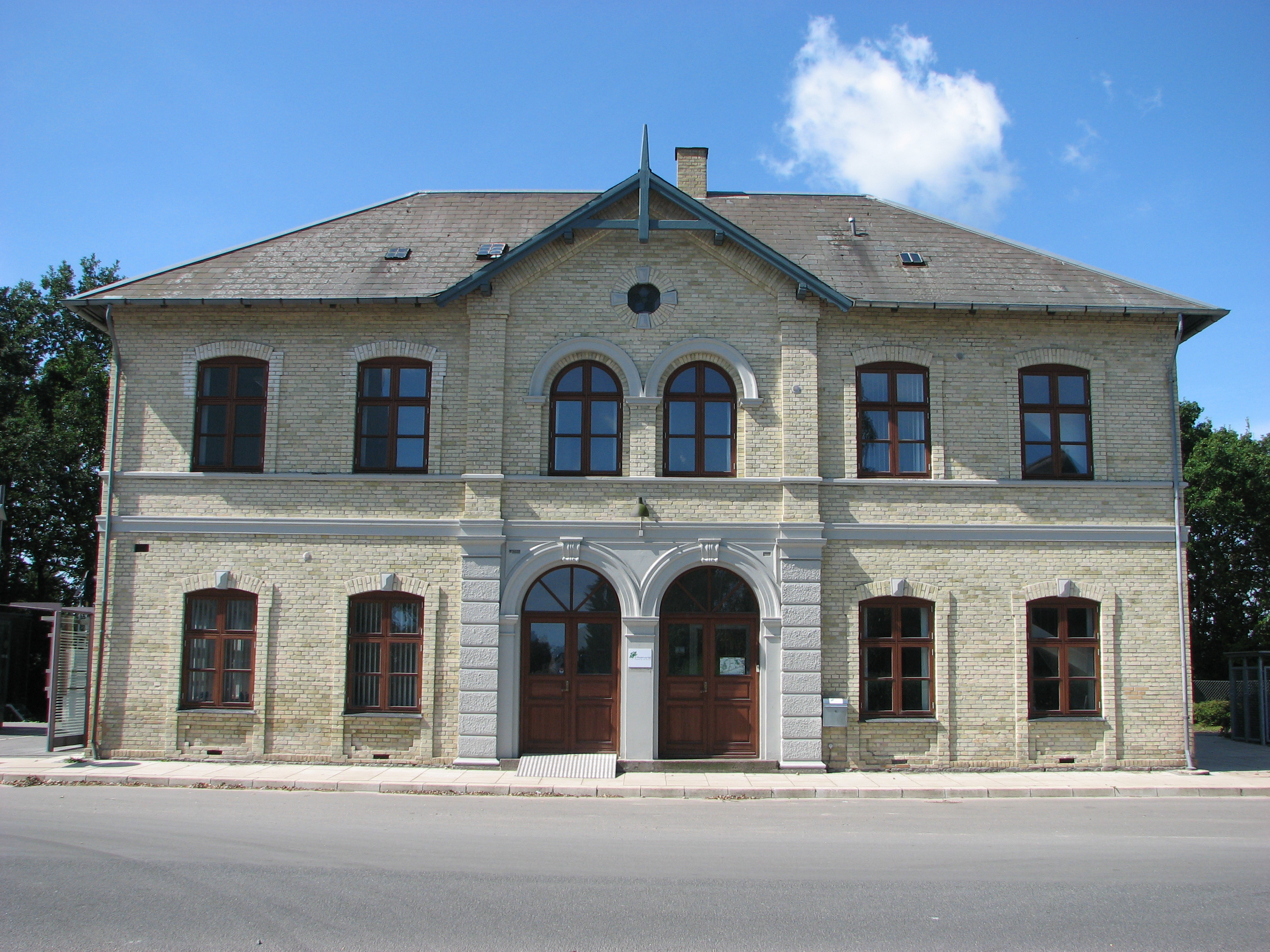
- Kværndrup train station

- Location in the Region of Southern Denmark
- Coordinates: 55°10′35″N 10°31′30″E
- Country: Denmark
- Region: Southern Denmark
- Municipality: Faaborg-Midtfyn

Area
  - Urban: 1.27 km^{2} (0.49 sq mi)

Population (2026)
  - Urban: 1,673
  - Urban density: 1,320/km^{2} (3,410/sq mi)
- Time zone: UTC+1 (CET)
  - Summer (DST): UTC+2 (CEST)

Kværndrup is a town located on the island of Funen in south Denmark, in Faaborg-Midtfyn Municipality.

== Places of interest ==
The Egeskov Castle is located about two kilometres from the town, which dates back to the 1400s and is Kværndrup's main attraction.

In the middle of the town lies Kværndrup Church, a Romanesque church with Gothic extensions from the 15th and 16th centuries with a cross-building, tower and porch. It formerly served as a church for Egeskov Castle.

== Notable people ==
Michael Ahlefeldt-Laurvig-Bille (born 1965) a Danish count and landowner of Egeskov Castle near Kværndrup

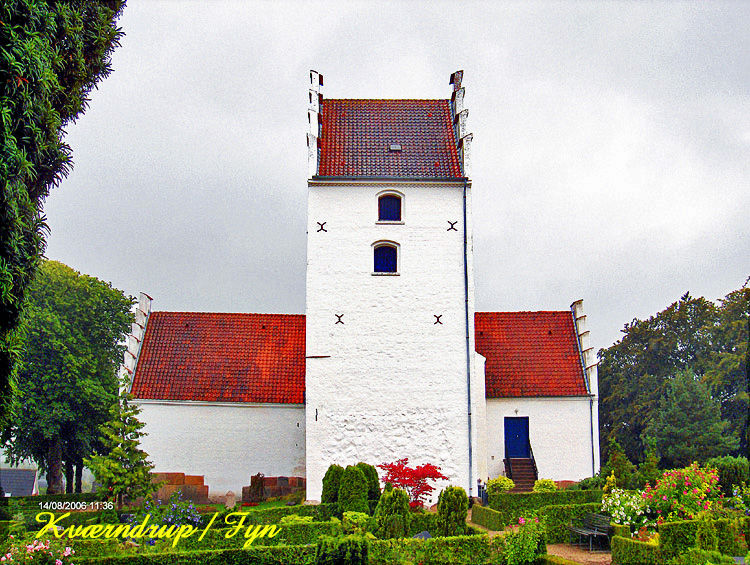
Kværndrup Church
