= Ringe, Denmark =

Ringe
- Town
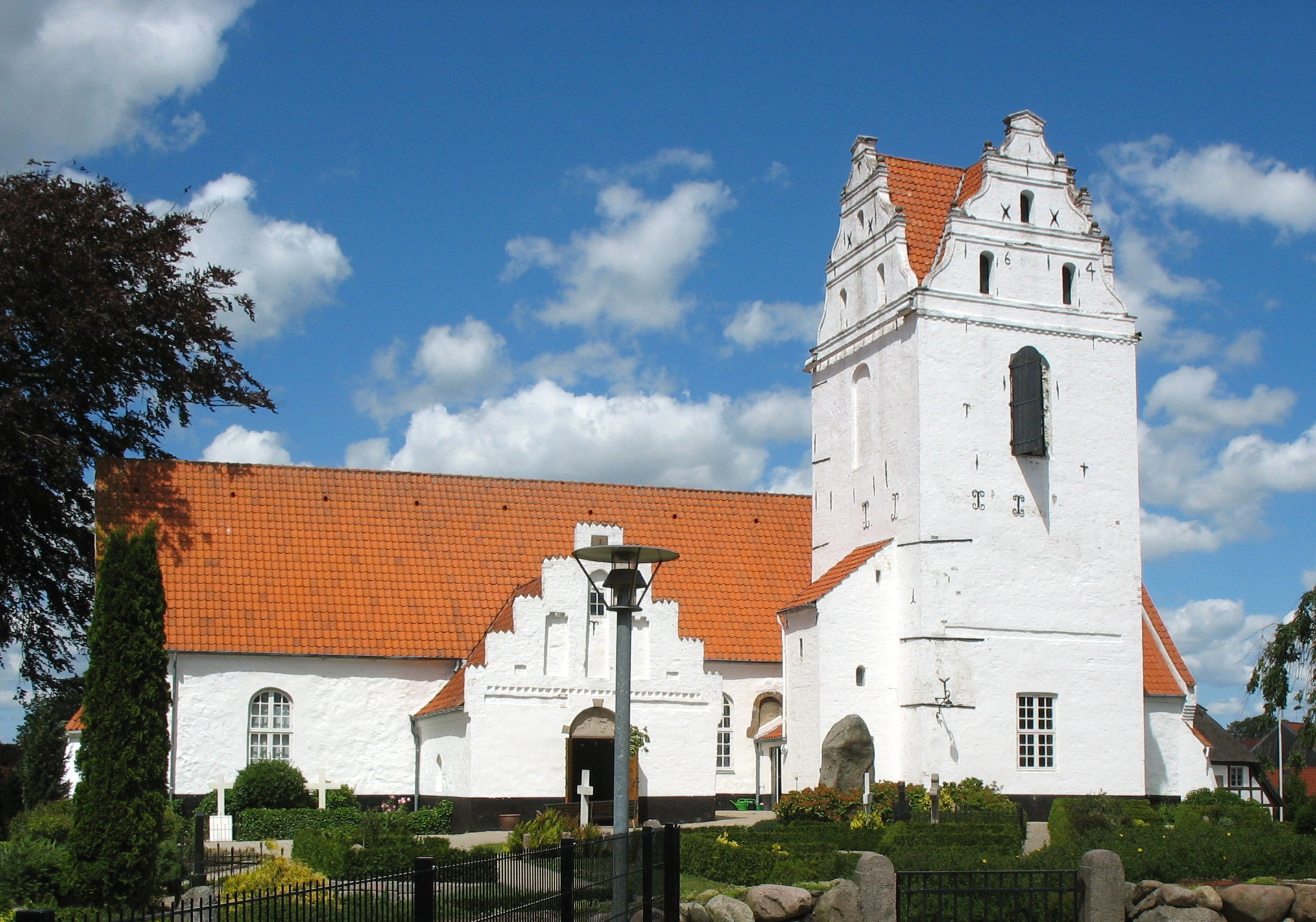
- Ringe Church.

- Location in Denmark Ringe (Region of Southern Denmark)
- Coordinates: 55°14′15″N 10°28′49″E
- Country: Denmark
- Region: Southern Denmark
- Municipality: Faaborg-Midtfyn

Area
  - Urban: 5.2 km^{2} (2.0 sq mi)

Population (2026)
  - Urban: 6,852
  - Urban density: 1,300/km^{2} (3,400/sq mi)
  - Gender: 3,310 males and 3,542 females
- Time zone: UTC+1 (CET)
  - Summer (DST): UTC+2 (CEST)
- Postal code: DK-5750 Ringe

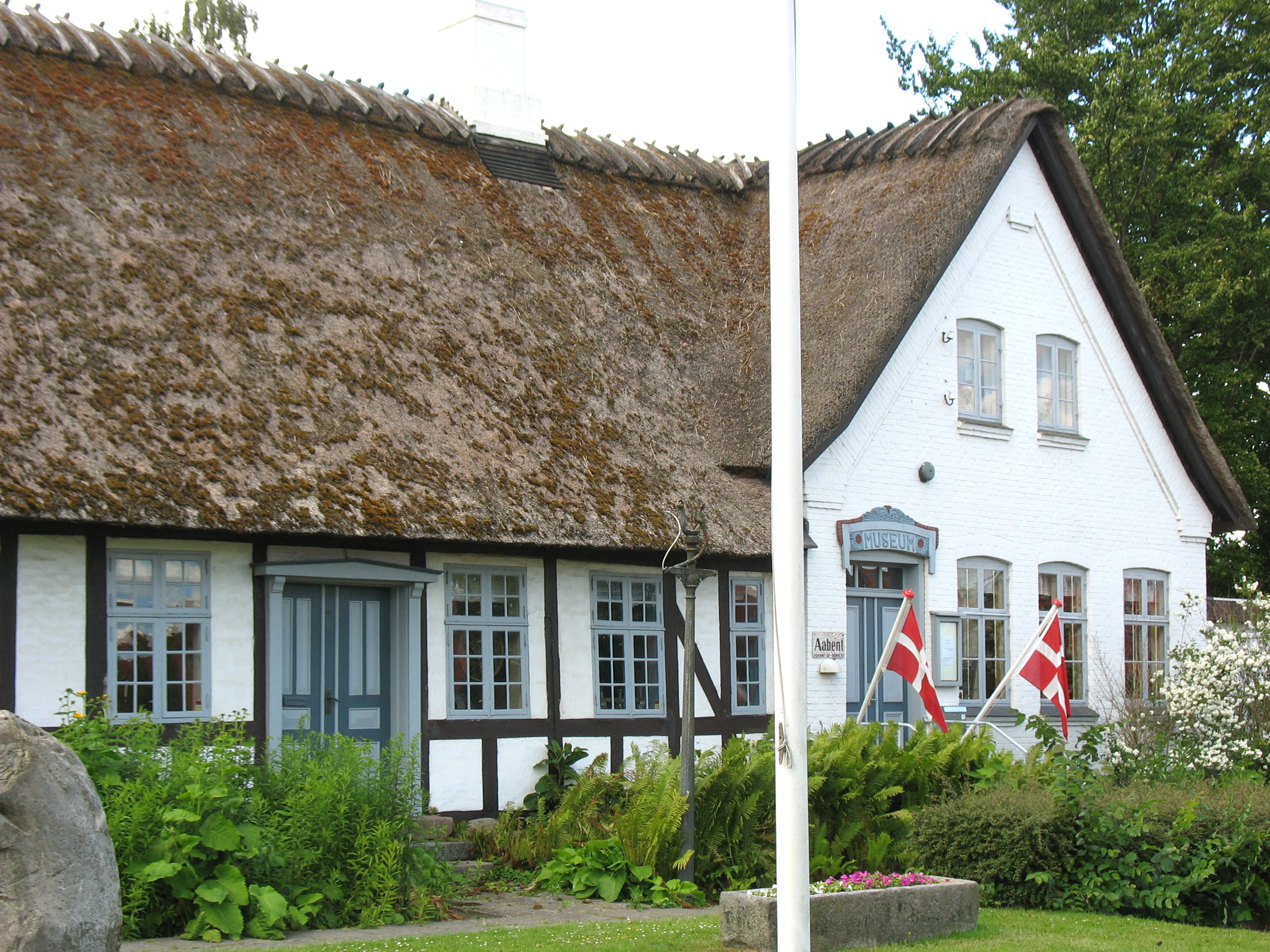
Ringe Museum

Ringe is a town with a population of 6,852 (1 January 2026) on Funen in southern Denmark. It is the seat of Faaborg-Midtfyn Municipality and was the seat of the now abolished Ringe municipality. The main office of Rynkeby Foods, a major Danish producer of juice and squash, is located in Ringe.

== Landmarks ==
=== Museum ===
The Ringe Museum is the only existing museum in the town and is a vast part of its cultural history.

In 1704, the building was constructed as a school, with many improvements and adjustments being made in 1737. The museum is run by Midtfyns Museumsforening and is funded by Faaborg-Midtfyn Kommune, who owns the building itself.

The museum has two interiors (bedroom and living room), an extensive array of historical weaponry and a broad collection of tools representing numerous crafts. It hosts many exhibitions often, showcasing the museum's collection.

=== Church ===
The town is home to the Ringe Church, which was constructed around the year 1200. The church itself has an armory, altar, pulpit, baptismal font, burial chapel, an organ, a broad set of art, and memorial plaques and stones. Today, it is home to many activities, such as musical performances, wedding parades, and baptisms.

The church tower is under renovation since 25 April 2021.

=== Lake ===
The Ringe Sø is a popular attraction in the town. It is a shallow lake home to numerous species, such as the Red-necked grebe, Eurasian coot, Common moorhen, Mallard, and Greylag goose.

After the last glacial period ended, a glacier from Munen melted and formed the lake.

== Notable people ==
- Jens Laursøn Emborg (born 1876 in Ringe – 1957) an organist and composer
- Erik Eriksen (born 1902 in Brangstrup – 1972) 15th Prime Minister of Denmark, 1950–1953
- Aksel Bender Madsen (born 1916 in Ringe – 2000) a Danish modern furniture designer
- Egon Madsen (born 1942) dancer
- Henriette Bonde-Hansen (born 1963 in Rudme) a Danish operatic soprano
- Anne Sofie Madsen (born 1979 in Ringe) an avant-garde fashion designer

=== Sport ===
- Johannes Gandil (born 1873 in Ringe – 1956) an amateur footballer, team silver medallist at the 1908 Summer Olympics
- Palle Lykke (born 1936 in Ringe – 2013) a cyclist, competed at the 1956 Summer Olympics
- Thierry Tribondeau (born 1962 in Ringe) a French bobsledder
- Ann Spejlsgaard (born 1978 in Ringe) a sport shooter, selected for the 2004 Summer Olympics
- Niclas Kirkeløkke (born 1994 in Ringe) a handball player
