= Faaborg-Midtfyn Municipality =

Faaborg-Midtfyn Municipality Faaborg-Midtfyn Kommune (Danish)
- Municipality
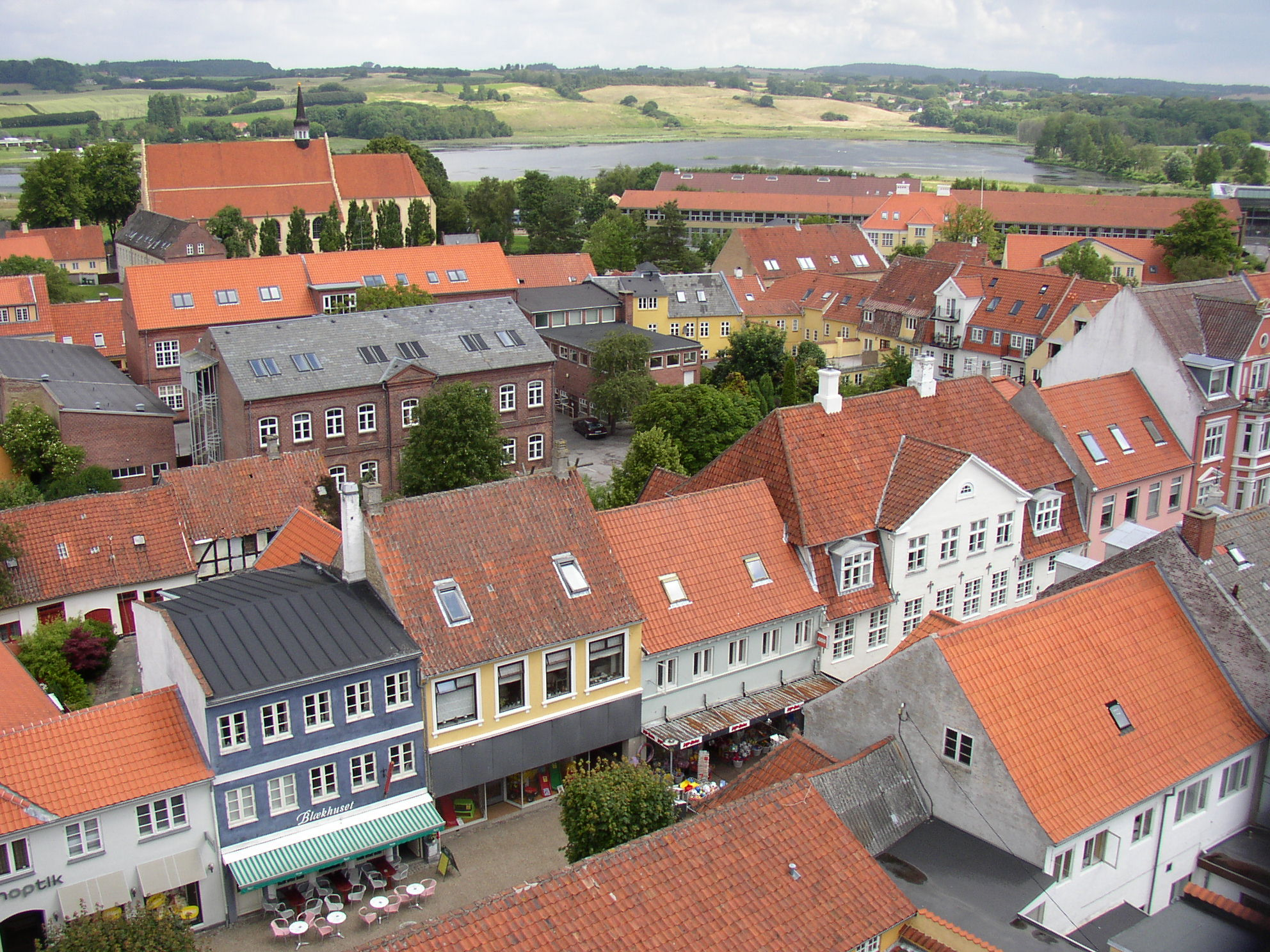

- Flag Coat of arms

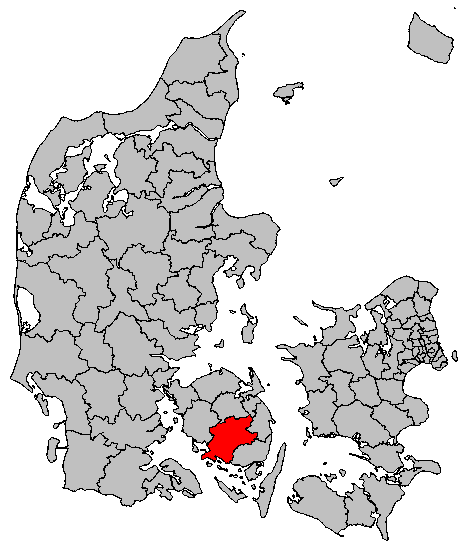
- Coordinates: 55.2267°N 10.4067°E
- Country: Denmark
- Region: South Denmark
- Established: 1 January 2007
- Seat: Ringe

Government
  - Mayor: Hans Stavnsager

Area
  - Total: 637.48 km^{2} (246.13 sq mi)

Population (1 January 2026)
  - Total: 52,328
  - Density: 82.086/km^{2} (212.60/sq mi)
- Time zone: UTC+1 (CET)
  - Summer (DST): UTC+2 (CEST)
- Postal code: 5750
- Municipal code: 430
- Website: fmk.dk

Faaborg-Midtfyn Municipality (Danish: Faaborg-Midtfyn Kommune; formerly Fåborg-Midtfyn) is a kommune in the Region of Southern Denmark in Denmark. It covers an area of 638 km^{2} and has a total population of 52,328 (2026).

On 1 January 2007 Faaborg-Midtfyn municipality was created as the result of Kommunalreformen ("The Municipal Reform" of 2007), consisting of the former municipalities of Broby, Ringe, Aarslev, Ryslinge, and Faaborg.

== Locations ==
The ten largest urban areas in the municipality are:

Largest cities and villages in Faaborg-Midtfyn Municipality
Name	Population (2024)
Faaborg	6,867
Ringe	6,729
Årslev	4,367
Nørre Lyndelse	2,325
Ryslinge	1,876
Kværndrup	1,705
Nørre Broby	1,485
Gislev	1,252
Brobyværk	1,081
Vejle	1,058

== Politics ==
Faaborg-Midtfyn's municipal council consists of 25 members, elected every four years. The municipal council has six political committees.

=== Municipal council ===
Below are the municipal councils elected since the Municipal Reform of 2007.

Election	Party									Total seats	Turnout	Elected mayor
Election	A	B	C	F	L	O	V	Ø	Å	Total seats	Turnout	Elected mayor
2005	11	1	2	2		2	11			29	75.1%	Bo Andersen (V)
2009	12		2	4		2	9			29	73.0%	Hans Jørgensen (A)
2013	7			2	1	4	10	1		25	76.5%	Christian Thygesen (V)
2017	8	2	1	1		4	7	1	1	25	74.8%	Hans Stavnsager (A)
Data from Kmdvalg.dk 2005, 2009, 2013 and 2017
