= The Traitors India =

Indian reality competition series franchise

- Based on: De Verraders by Marc Pos; Jasper Hoogendoorn

Films and television
- Television series: The Traitors (independent language versions, see below)

Miscellaneous
- Languages: Hindi; Telugu
- Original network: Prime Video

The Traitors is an Indian reality competition series streaming on Prime Video, based on the Dutch series De Verraders.

Following the premise of De Verraders, the show features a group of contestants participating in a game similar to Mafia or Werewolf, where an informed minority (known as the "Traitors") must eliminate an uninformed majority (known as the "Innocents") to win. Meanwhile, the "Innocents" are tasked to discover the "Traitors" and vote them out of the game in order to win.

== History ==
The first official teaser was posted on Prime Video's social media on 17 September 2024, announcing that filming had begun. Later on 30 May 2025, the official trailer of The Traitors Hindi season 1 was released with the premiere date of 12 June 2025.

=== Expansion ===
The success of the first season of the Hindi-language version led to the development of the Telugu-language version of the series.

== Format ==
A group of contestants arrive at the palace with hopes of winning a large cash prize of ₹1 crore that is built up through missions. The players are referred to as the "Innocents", but among them are the "Traitors" — a group of contestants secretly selected by the host. If the Innocents eliminate all the Traitors, they will share the prize fund. However, if any Traitors manage to make it to the end, eliminating the Innocents, they win the entire prize money.

The contestants participate in missions to build up their cash prize. In some missions, any contestant may also win a ‘shield’ that grants them immunity from the subsequent murder.

On most nights, The Traitors meet in a secret tower to decide on an Innocent contestant to ‘murder,’ who is then immediately eliminated from the game. The remaining Innocents are unaware of who has been eliminated until the following morning, when that person fails to appear at the breakfast table in the castle.

At the end of each day, the players gather at the ‘Round Table,’ where they discuss whom to vote out before individually casting their votes. Players vote privately, then reveal their choices one by one, often giving a brief rationale for their decision. The player who receives the most votes is banished from the game and reveals their affiliation. If during the game the number of ‘Traitors’ drops to two, they are given the choice to recruit an Innocent to join them instead of murdering.

After the final Round Table, the remaining players participate in the End Game. The group are given an opportunity to end the game by unanimous vote. Any vote to continue will lead to another immediate banishment vote. When a unanimous decision is reached to end the game — or when there are only two players left — the remaining players reveal their affiliation. If all remaining players are Innocents, then the prize money is divided evenly among them. However, if any Traitors remain, they win the entire prize money.

== Versions ==
Currently streaming – 0
Upcoming for streaming – 0
Recently concluded – 2

Language	Title	Season	Host	Network	Contestants	Episodes	Originally Released		Production Location	Prize	Winner(s)	Winner(s) Affiliation
Language	Title	Season	Host	Network	Contestants	Episodes	First Released	Last Released	Production Location	Prize	Winner(s)	Winner(s) Affiliation
Hindi (हिन्दी)	The Traitors (Hindi)	1	Karan Johar	Prime Video	20	10	12 June 2025	3 July 2025	Suryagarh Palace, Jaisalmer	₹70,05,000	Nikita Luther Uorfi Javed	Innocents
Hindi (हिन्दी)	The Traitors (Hindi)	2	Karan Johar	Prime Video	21	11	13 August 2026	9 September 2026	Suryagarh Palace, Jaisalmer	₹66,00,000	Krystle D'Souza Rida Tharana	Traitors
Telugu (తెలుగు)	The Traitors (Telugu)	1	Teja Sajja	Prime Video	20	10	15 October 2026	5 November 2026	Lalitha Mahal, Mysuru	₹42,77,000	Shravya Varma Sweekar Agasthi	Traitors
