= The Traitors (Hindi TV series) =

Prime Video reality competition show

- Genre: Reality; Game show
- Based on: De Verraders by: Marc Pos; Jasper Hoogendoorn
- Written by: Juhi Goklani
- Directed by: Nishant Nayak
- Creative director: Neeraj Shetty
- Presented by: Karan Johar
- Country of origin: India
- Original language: Hindi
- No. of seasons: 2
- No. of episodes: 21

Production
- Executive producers: Neha Khurana (2025–present); Aneesha Baig (2026)
- Producers: Sameer Gogate (2025); Karan Johar (2026); Adar Poonawalla (2026); Apoorva Mehta (2026)
- Production locations: Suryagarh Palace, Jaisalmer, India
- Cinematography: Sudhir Koushik
- Camera setup: Multi-camera
- Running time: 75+ minutes
- Production companies: BBC Studios India (2025); Dharmatic Entertainment (2026)

Original release
- Network: Amazon Prime Video
- Release: 12 June 2025 – present

Related
- The Traitors India; The Traitors Telugu

The Traitors is an Indian Hindi-language reality competition series of the The Traitors India franchise streaming on Prime Video, based on the Dutch series De Verraders. Hosted by filmmaker Karan Johar, the series premiered on 12 June 2025.

Following the premise of De Verraders, the show features a group of contestants participating in a game similar to Mafia or Werewolf, where an informed minority (known as the "Traitors") must eliminate an uninformed majority (known as the "Innocents") to win. Meanwhile, the "Innocents" are tasked to discover the "Traitors" and vote them out of the game in order to win. The series is filmed in and around Suryagarh Palace.

== Format ==
A group of contestants arrive at the palace in Jaisalmer, Rajasthan with hopes of winning a large cash prize of ₹1 crore that is built up through missions. The players are referred to as the "Innocents", but among them are the "Traitors" — a group of contestants secretly selected by the host. If the Innocents eliminate all the Traitors, they will share the prize fund. However, if any Traitors manage to make it to the end, eliminating the Innocents, they win the entire prize money.

The contestants participate in missions to build up their cash prize. In some missions, any contestant may also win a ‘shield’ that grants them immunity from the subsequent murder.

On most nights, The Traitors meet in a secret tower to decide on an Innocent contestant to ‘murder,’ who is then immediately eliminated from the game. The remaining Innocents are unaware of who has been eliminated until the following morning, when that person fails to appear at the breakfast table in the castle.

At the end of each day, the players gather at the ‘Circle of Shaq,’ where they discuss whom to vote out before individually casting their votes. Players vote privately, then reveal their choices one by one, often giving a brief rationale for their decision. The player who receives the most votes is banished from the game and reveals their affiliation. If during the game the number of ‘Traitors’ drops to two, they are given the choice to recruit an Innocent to join them instead of murdering.

After the final Circle of Shaq, the remaining players participate in the End Game. The group are given an opportunity to end the game by unanimous vote. Any vote to continue will lead to another immediate banishment vote. When a unanimous decision is reached to end the game — or when there are only two players left — the remaining players reveal their affiliation. If all remaining players are Innocents, then the prize money is divided evenly among them. However, if any Traitors remain, they win the entire prize money.

== Production ==
The first official teaser was posted on Prime Video's social media on 17 September 2024, announcing that filming had begun. Later on 30 May 2025, the official trailer of season 1 was released with the premiere date of 12 June 2025.

On 25 June 2026, the show was renewed for a second season. The first teaser was released on 27 July 2026, which revealed the premiere date of 13 August 2026, and the first two contestants joining the show, comedian Munawar Faruqui and actress Mallika Sherawat.

== Episodes ==
=== Series overview ===
Series overview
Series	Contestants	Episodes	Originally released		Winner(s)	Prize	Traitors
Series	Contestants	Episodes	First released	Last released	Winner(s)	Prize	Traitors
1	20	10	12 June 2025	3 July 2025	Nikita Luther Uorfi Javed	₹70,05,000	Elnaaz Norouzi Purav Jha Raj Kundra Harsh Gujral (from ep. 8)
2	21	11	13 August 2026	9 September 2026	Krystle D'Souza Rida Tharana	₹66,00,000	Aaditya "Kullu" Kulshreshth Harman Singha Krystle D'Souza Shahneel Gill (from ep. 2) Rida Tharana (from ep. 8)

=== Season 1 ===
The Traitors season 1 episodes
No. overall	No. in season	Title	Original release date
1	1	"Episode 1"	12 June 2025
2	2	"Episode 2"	12 June 2025
3	3	"Episode 3"	12 June 2025
4	4	"Episode 4"	19 June 2025
5	5	"Episode 5"	19 June 2025
6	6	"Episode 6"	19 June 2025
7	7	"Episode 7"	26 June 2025
8	8	"Episode 8"	26 June 2025
9	9	"Episode 9"	26 June 2025
10	10	"Episode 10"	3 July 2025

=== Season 2 ===
The Traitors season 2 episodes
No. overall	No. in season	Title	Original release date
11	1	"Episode 1"	13 August 2026
12	2	"Episode 2"	13 August 2026
13	3	"Episode 3"	13 August 2026
14	4	"Episode 4"	20 August 2026
15	5	"Episode 5"	20 August 2026
16	6	"Episode 6"	20 August 2026
17	7	"Episode 7"	27 August 2026
18	8	"Episode 8"	27 August 2026
19	9	"Episode 9"	27 August 2026
20	10	"Episode 10"	3 September 2026
21	11	"Reunion"	9 September 2026

== International broadcast ==
In Australia, the series became available to stream on 10 Play in October 2025, as a companion to the Australian version broadcast by the network. The series was presented with English subtitles.

In the United Kingdom, the series began broadcasting on BBC Three and became available to stream on BBC iPlayer on 30 April 2026. It was broadcast by the BBC, which also airs the British version.

== Reception ==
=== Critical reception ===
A review in India Today praised the show’s glamorous setting and Karan Johar’s hosting style. The first season generated significant discussion on social media for its headline making early evictions and several other viral movements. Variety reported that the second season became Prime Video’s No. 1 non-English title worldwide during its launch week.

=== Awards and nominations ===
Year	Award	Category	Nominee(s)	Result	Ref.
2025	Asian Academy Creative Awards	Best Adaptation of an Existing Format (Non Scripted)	The Traitors season 1	Won	
2025	Asian Academy Creative Awards	Best Direction (Non-Fiction)	Nishant Nayak	National Winner (India)	
2025	Asian Academy Creative Awards	Best Entertainment Host	Karan Johar	Won	
2025	Asian Academy Creative Awards	Best Original Production by a Streamer (Non-Fiction)	The Traitors season 1	National Winner (India)	
