= Anchan (surname) =

Anchan is a surname. Notable people with the surname include:

- Ali Sher Khan Anchan (1590–1625), ruler of Baltistan
- Shamata Anchan (born 1990), Indian model and television actress
