= Shamata Anchan =

Indian actress and model

- Born: Mangalore, Karnataka, India
- Occupations: Actress, Model

Shamata Anchan is an Indian television actress and a model.

== Early life ==
Shamata Anchan is from a Tulu-speaking Billava (Poojary) family that hails from Mangalore, Karnataka.

== Career ==
=== Modelling ===
She is the winner of Pantaloons Femina Miss India South 2012 pageant. She was also one of the finalists of Pantaloons Femina Miss India 2012. She has done many advertisements for famous brands and has done modelling and print campaigns for many fashion designers, and cosmetics brands like Santoor. She was also a part of Chal Kar Pehel, an initiative launched by Star Plus.

=== Television ===
Shamata Anchan debuted on television with the show Everest, produced by filmmaker Ashutosh Gowarikar. She played the role of Anjali Singh Rawat, the main lead in the show along with Rohan Gandotra and Sahil Salathia. The show aired on Star Plus channel. She was also the female lead of the serial Bin Kuch Kahe, which aired on Zee Tv.

=== Films ===
Shamata has done an extended cameo in the Hollywood movie, Heartbeats. Shamata was made her Bollywood debuted with movie The Field in 2019 alongside Abhay Deol. She debuted as a sub-inspector of Mumbai police alongside Rajinikanth starrer Darbar in 2020.

== Television ==
Year	Serial	Role	Channel
2014–2015	Everest	Anjali Singh Rawat	Star Plus
2017	Bin Kuch Kahe	Myra Kohli	Zee TV

=== Films ===
- 2020 Darbar as Police Officer
