= Karan Singh (magician) =

Indian magician (born 1991)

- Born: 19 July 1991 (age 35); Patna, Bihar, India
- Occupation: Magician/Streamer

YouTube information
- Channel: Karan Singh Magic
- Subscribers: 607 thousand
- Views: 62.7 million
- Last updated: 30 October 2025

Karan Singh (born 19 July 1991) is an Indian magician. He is known for using his audience as a prop while performing on stage and 'the mentalist who figured out Shah Rukh Khan's ATM Pin' by GQ India.

== Early life and education ==
Singh was born in Mumbai, India. He spent the first four years of his life in Mumbai. His family moved to Delhi after his father's transfer. He attended The Mother's International School in Delhi. He enrolled in the Shri Guru Tegh Bahadur Khalsa College of the University of Delhi to work toward a bachelor's degree in Commerce. However, he dropped out of college in the third year to pursue magic full-time.

== Professional career ==
Singh's first exposure to magic occurred in 2002 at a summer camp in Tirthan near Kullu Manali where he met a magician named Ishammudin Khan who taught him his first two tricks. For his initial years, he performed only those two tricks until he stumbled upon David Blaine on television.

In 2007, at the age of 16, he performed his first show for the 12th graders' farewell at his school. Following this, he did a series of magic shows at kid's birthday parties dressed up as Aladdin.

Singh gained popularity after his first commercial show- 'Karan Singh Magic: Saltus' at Siri Fort Auditorium, New Delhi. Sponsored by Pepsi, Singh performed for former Pepsi Chairperson and CEO Indra Nooyi.

During the COVID-19 pandemic, all outdoor events were cancelled and thus, Singh could no longer perform public shows. He began performing as an online medium with a mind-reading show on Zoom. He has performed more than 800 digital shows as of 16 June 2021.

In 2025, Singh appeared on the first episode of David Blaine's television show, David Blaine Do Not Attempt.

In 2026, Singh appeared as a contestant on the second season of the reality show, The Traitors India.
