= The Traitors (Telugu TV series) =

Prime Video reality competition show

- Genre: Reality; Game show
- Based on: De Verraders by: Marc Pos; Jasper Hoogendoorn
- Creative directors: Prashanth Malisetti; Debanjana Moitra
- Presented by: Teja Sajja
- Country of origin: India
- Original language: Telugu
- No. of seasons: 1
- No. of episodes: 10

Production
- Executive producer: Meghana Badola
- Producers: Fazila Allana; Kamna Menezes
- Production locations: Lalitha Mahal, Mysuru, India
- Camera setup: Multi-camera
- Running time: 70+ minutes
- Production company: SOL Production LLP

Original release
- Network: Amazon Prime Video
- Release: 15 October 2026 – present

Related
- The Traitors India; The Traitors Hindi

The Traitors is an Indian Telugu-language reality competition series competition series of the The Traitors India franchise streaming on Prime Video, based on the Dutch series De Verraders. Hosted by actor Teja Sajja, the series premiered on 15 October 2026.

Following the premise of De Verraders, the show features a group of contestants participating in a game similar to Mafia or Werewolf, where an informed minority (known as the "Traitors") must eliminate an uninformed majority (known as the "Innocents") to win. Meanwhile, the "Innocents" are tasked to discover the "Traitors" and vote them out of the game in order to win. The series is filmed in and around Lalitha Mahal.

== Format ==
A group of contestants arrive at the Mahal in Mysuru, Karnataka with hopes of winning a large cash prize of ₹1 crore that is built up through missions. The players are referred to as the "Innocents", but among them are the "Traitors" — a group of contestants secretly selected by the host. If the Innocents eliminate all the Traitors, they will share the prize fund. However, if any Traitors manage to make it to the end, eliminating the Innocents, they win the entire prize money.

The contestants participate in missions to build up their cash prize. In some missions, any contestant may also win a ‘shield’ that grants them immunity from the subsequent murder.

On most nights, The Traitors meet in a secret tower to decide on an Innocent contestant to ‘murder,’ who is then immediately eliminated from the game. The remaining Innocents are unaware of who has been eliminated until the following morning, when that person fails to appear at the breakfast table in the castle.

At the end of each day, the players gather at the ‘Ring of Doubt,’ where they discuss whom to vote out before individually casting their votes. Players vote privately, then reveal their choices one by one, often giving a brief rationale for their decision. The player who receives the most votes is banished from the game and reveals their affiliation. If during the game the number of ‘Traitors’ drops to two, they are given the choice to recruit an Innocent to join them instead of murdering.

After the final Ring of Doubt, the remaining players participate in the End Game. The group are given an opportunity to end the game by unanimous vote. Any vote to continue will lead to another immediate banishment vote. When a unanimous decision is reached to end the game — or when there are only two players left — the remaining players reveal their affiliation. If all remaining players are Innocents, then the prize money is divided evenly among them. However, if any Traitors remain, they win the entire prize money.

== Production ==
The success of the first season of the Hindi version led to the development of a Telugu-language adaptation. The series was announced by Amazon Prime Video in March 2026 as part of its 2026 Indian programming slate. It is produced by SOL Productions and features actor Teja Sajja as the host.

The first official trailer was posted on Prime Video's social media on 29 September 2026, with the premiere date of 15 October 2026.

== Episodes ==
=== Series overview ===
Series overview
Series	Contestants	Episodes	Originally released		Winner(s)	Prize	Traitors
Series	Contestants	Episodes	First released	Last released	Winner(s)	Prize	Traitors
1	20	10	15 October 2026	5 November 2026	Shravya Varma; Sweekar Agasthi (Traitors)	₹42,77,000	Ashika Gopal Padukone; Rahat Achanta; Vidyullekha Raman; Vishnu Oi (from ep. 4); Sweekar Agasthi (from ep. 7); Shravya Varma (from ep. 9)

=== Season 1 ===
The Traitors season 1 episodes
No. overall	No. in season	Title	Original release date
1	1	"Episode 1"	15 October 2026
2	2	"Episode 2"	15 October 2026
3	3	"Episode 3"	15 October 2026
4	4	"Episode 4"	22 October 2026
5	5	"Episode 5"	22 October 2026
6	6	"Episode 6"	22 October 2026
7	7	"Episode 7"	29 October 2026
8	8	"Episode 8"	29 October 2026
9	9	"Episode 9"	29 October 2026
10	10	"Episode 10"	5 November 2026

== Reception ==
The show received a mixed-to-positive reception. While viewers praised its high production values, atmospheric Mysuru setting, and psychological format, early episodes were critiqued for favoring emotional reality TV drama over cold, calculated gameplay. Host Teja Sajja’s debut drew varied reactions, with some praising his composed presence and others wanting a more commanding roundtable delivery.
