= The Traitors (Hindi TV series) season 1 =

The Traitors
- Season 1
- Presented by: Karan Johar
- No. of contestants: 20
- Winners: Nikita Luther; Uorfi Javed
- Location: Suryagarh Palace, Jaisalmer, Rajasthan
- No. of episodes: 10

Release
- Original network: Prime Video
- Original release: 12 June – 3 July 2025

Season chronology
- Next → Season 2

The first season of The Traitors premiered on Prime Video on 12 June 2025, with Karan Johar as the host. The season concluded on 3 July 2025, with Nikita Luther and Uorfi Javed winning the inaugural season as Innocents.

== Format ==
A group of contestants arrive at the palace in Jaisalmer, Rajasthan with hopes of winning a large cash prize of ₹1 crore that is built up through missions. The players are referred to as the "Innocents", but among them are the "Traitors" — a group of contestants secretly selected by the host. If the Innocents eliminate all the Traitors, they will share the prize fund. However, if any Traitors manage to make it to the end, eliminating the Innocents, they win the entire prize money.

The contestants participate in missions to build up their cash prize. In some missions, any contestant may also win a ‘shield’ that grants them immunity from the subsequent murder.

On most nights, The Traitors meet in a secret tower to decide on an Innocent contestant to ‘murder,’ who is then immediately eliminated from the game. The remaining Innocents are unaware of who has been eliminated until the following morning, when that person fails to appear at the breakfast table in the castle.

At the end of each day, the players gather at the ‘Circle of Shaq,’ where they discuss whom to vote out before individually casting their votes. Players vote privately, then reveal their choices one by one, often giving a brief rationale for their decision. The player who receives the most votes is banished from the game and reveals their affiliation. If during the game the number of ‘Traitors’ drops to two, they are given the choice to recruit an Innocent to join them instead of murdering.

After the final Circle of Shaq, the remaining players participate in the End Game. The group are given an opportunity to end the game by unanimous vote. Any vote to continue will lead to another immediate banishment vote. When a unanimous decision is reached to end the game — or when there are only two players left — the remaining players reveal their affiliation. If all remaining players are Innocents, then the prize money is divided evenly among them. However, if any Traitors remain, they win the entire prize money.

== Production ==
The first official teaser was posted on Prime Video's social media on 17 September 2024, announcing that filming had begun. Later on 30 May 2025, the official trailer of season 1 was released with the premiere date of 12 June 2025.

== Contestants ==
20 contestants competed on the first series of The Traitors. In a minor twist, Anshula and Maheep have a pre-existing relationship, as Maheep is Anshula’s paternal aunt.

Elnaaz was chosen by the rest of the players as the least trustworthy and she chose Nikita to be eliminated from the game on arrival at the castle in Episode 1. However, Nikita re-entered to the show in Episode 3.

List of The Traitors contestants
Contestant	Age	Notability	Affiliation	Finish
Sahil Salathia	35	Actor	Innocent	Murdered (Episode 2)
Raj Kundra	50	Actor & entrepreneur	Traitor	Banished (Episode 2)
Lakshmi Manchu	47	Actress & producer	Innocent	Murdered (Episode 3)
Karan Kundrra	39	Actor	Innocent	Banished (Episode 3)
Mukesh Chhabra	40	Casting director	Innocent	Murdered (Episode 4)
Maheep Kapoor	52	Reality show star	Innocent	Banished (Episode 4)
Ashish Vidyarthi	59	Actor	Innocent	Banished (Episode 5)
Raftaar	36	Musician	Innocent	Banished (Episode 6)
Janvi Gaur	50	Astrologer	Innocent	Murdered (Episode 7)
Elnaaz Norouzi	28	Actress	Traitor	Banished (Episode 7)
Sufi Motiwala	21	Content creator	Innocent	Murdered (Episode 8)
Anshula Kapoor	34	Content creator	Innocent	Banished (Episode 8)
Jannat Zubair Rahmani	24	Actress	Innocent	Murdered (Episode 9)
Apoorva Mukhija "The Rebel Kid"	23	Content creator	Innocent	Banished (Episode 9)
Jasmin Bhasin	34	Actress	Innocent	Murdered (Episode 10)
Purav Jha	23	YouTuber	Traitor	Banished (Episode 10)
Sudhanshu Pandey	51	Actor & Model	Innocent	Banished (Episode 10)
Harsh Gujral	34	Stand-up comedian	Innocent	Banished (Episode 10)
Harsh Gujral	34	Stand-up comedian	Traitor (from ep. 8)	Banished (Episode 10)
Uorfi Javed	27	Reality show star	Innocent	Winner (Episode 10)
Nikita Luther	34	Poker player	Innocent	Winner (Episode 10)

== Elimination history ==
Key

The contestant was an Innocent.
The contestant was a Traitor.
The contestant was murdered by the Traitors.
The contestant was banished at the round table.
The contestant was immune for the banishment and subsequent murder.

Episode	2	3	4	5	6	7	8		9	10
Traitor's decision	Sahil	Lakshmi	Mukesh	Nikita	Anshula; Harsh; Janvi; ~~Uorfi~~	Janvi	Sufi	Harsh	Jannat	Jasmin
Traitor's decision	Murder			Recruit (offer rejected by Nikita)	On; Trial (Note: Instead of selecting one Innocent to be murdered, the Traitors, Elnaaz and Purav, were asked to put four players on trial. The next night, only those four players would be up to be murdered. However, Uorfi was saved through a mission.)	Murder	Murder (by poisoning) (Note: The Traitor, Purav, was tasked to murder someone in plain sight, by poisoning the fountain water and then placing their victim’s picture in the poisoned fountain. The following morning, the players were told that the victim's identity would be revealed at the end of the funeral procession challenge.)	Blackmail (offer accepted by Harsh) (Note: Following Elnaaz’s banishment, Purav was offered the chance to meet an Innocent face-to-face and blackmail them into becoming a Traitor or be Murdered.)	Murder	
Shield	Not; Introduced	Harsh	Sufi	None		Jannat	None			
Banishment	Raj	Karan	Maheep	Ashish	Raftaar	Elnaaz	Anshula		Apoorva	Purav
Vote	15-2-1	11-3-2	7-5-2-1	9-1-1-1-1-1	8-4-1	5-3-1-1-1	5-2-1-1		5-3	4-1
Nikita	Exiled (Note: Elnaaz was chosen by the rest of the players as the least trustworthy and she chose Nikita to be eliminated from the game on arrival at the castle.) (Episode 1)	Not; Eligible	Janvi	Anshula	Sufi	Anshula	Uorfi		Apoorva	Purav
Uorfi	Raj	Karan	Maheep	Ashish	Sufi	Elnaaz	Anshula		Apoorva	Purav
Harsh	Raj	Karan	Raftaar	Ashish	Raftaar	Elnaaz	Anshula		Apoorva	Purav
Sudhanshu	Raj	Karan	Raftaar	Ashish	Raftaar	Purav	Harsh		Apoorva	Purav
Purav	Raj	Jasmin	Maheep	Ashish	Sufi	Elnaaz	Anshula		Harsh; Harsh†	Sudhanshu
Jasmin	Raj	Maheep	Maheep	Apoorva	Raftaar	Elnaaz	Apoorva		Apoorva	Murdered (Episode 10)
Apoorva	Raj	Karan	Maheep	Ashish	Raftaar	Sufi	Anshula		Harsh	Banished (Episode 9)
Jannat	Raj	Karan	Maheep	Ashish	Raftaar	Elnaaz	Anshula		Murdered (Episode 9)	
Anshula	Raj	Karan	Raftaar	Ashish	Apoorva	Purav	Harsh		Banished (Episode 8)	
Sufi	Raj	Karan	Raftaar	Raftaar	Raftaar	Purav	Murdered (Episode 8)			
Elnaaz	Raj	Jasmin	Janvi	Ashish	Raftaar	Uorfi	Banished (Episode 7)			
Janvi	Raj	Maheep	Raftaar	Ashish	Raftaar	Murdered (Episode 7)				
Raftaar	Raj	Karan	Maheep	Sufi	Sufi	Banished (Episode 6)				
Ashish	Raj	Karan	Maheep	Elnaaz	Banished (Episode 5)					
Maheep	Janvi	Karan	Ashish	Banished (Episode 4)						
Mukesh	Raj	Karan	Murdered (Episode 4)							
Karan	Raj	Maheep	Banished (Episode 3)							
Lakshmi	Ashish	Murdered (Episode 3)								
Raj	Ashish	Banished (Episode 2)								
Sahil	Murdered (Episode 2)									

=== End game ===
Decision	Banish	Sudhanshu	Banish	Harsh	Game; Ended
Vote	2–2	3–1	2–1	2–1	Game; Ended
Nikita	Shaq	Sudhanshu	Shaq	Harsh	Winner
Uorfi	Shaq	Sudhanshu	Shaq	Harsh	Winner
Harsh	Trust	Sudhanshu	Trust	Nikita	Banished
Sudhanshu	Trust	Uorfi	Banished		
Purav	Banished				

== Missions ==
Episode	Money available	Money earned	Total pot	Shield
1	₹18,00,000	₹0	₹0	Not Introduced
Nineteen players boarded a train with three compartments — two compartments had six players each, and the third had seven players. Each group of players was tasked with solving three clues. For every correct answer, ₹2,00,000 would be added to their total prize pot. However, all three groups had to complete their guesses before the train reached its final destination. If any group failed to do so, the entire prize would be forfeited.
2	₹15,00,000	₹5,10,000	₹5,10,000	Not Introduced
Five players had to nominate themselves to be strapped to a revolving wheel, while the remaining contestants answered superlative style questions. Each player on the wheel also had to answer the same questions. For every answer that matched the majority choice of the group, money was added to the prize pot. Apoorva, Elnaaz, Jannat, Jasmin, and Sufi were selected to ride the wheel.
3	₹15,00,000	₹8,55,000	₹13,65,000	Harsh
The players were asked to select two team captains. They chose Anshula and Ashish.: Team Anshula: Apoorva, Elnaaz, Jasmin, Maheep, Purav, Raftaar, Sudhanshu; Team Ashish: Harsh, Jannat, Janvi, Karan, Mukesh, Sufi, Uorfi; Each team had to dig through a mud pile to find gold nuggets, each worth ₹30,000. The nuggets then had to be transported across a body of water to a weighing scale within a 10-minute time limit. The total value collected by both teams was added to the prize pot. The winning team also earned a shield, which they could award to one member of their own team. They mutually decided to give the shield to Harsh.
4	₹7,50,000	₹15,00,000	₹28,65,000	Sufi
The Traitors were given a secret mission, To double the prize money of the challenge by secretly placing axes bearing the Traitors’ seal hidden throughout the palace walls into a chest located in the lounge area.
Players were tasked with digging up hidden gold bars and delivering them to Karan Johar, all while avoiding moving spotlights. If anyone was caught in the spotlight, they were immediately eliminated from the task, and any money they were carrying was forfeited. Adding an extra layer of strategy, three graves contained shields that could protect contestants from a murder, but only one shield was successfully retrieved, by Sufi. Elnaaz completed the secret mission successfully, securing the reward and doubling the earnings ₹7,50,000 in the following mission.
5	₹10,00,000	₹0	₹28,65,000	None
The players were asked to divide into two groups.: Group 1: Anshula, Elnaaz, Jannat, Janvi, Nikita, Raftaar, Uorfi; Group 2: Apoorva, Ashish, Harsh, Jasmin, Purav, Sudhanshu, Sufi; Each group had to spend 30-minutes in their respective room with a Red Button and a phone connecting the two rooms.: Option 1: If no group presses the Red Button, they earn ₹10,00,000.; Option 2: If any one group presses the Red Button, that group will get an opportunity to get shields and earn ₹10,00,000.; Option 3: If both groups press the Red Button, they lose the opportunity to get shields and also lose ₹10,00,000.; Both groups pressed the red button; neither the shields nor the money were earned.
6	₹15,00,000	₹14,40,000	₹43,05,000	None
Split into two groups, the players embarked on separate hikes to find gold bars. Alongside this task, they were given an opportunity to save a player ‘on trial’ from being murdered that night.: Group 1: Apoorva, Jannat, Nikita, Sudhanshu, Sufi; Group 2: Elnaaz, Jasmin, Purav, Raftaar; During the hike, both groups had to answer a series of questions. These same questions had been asked earlier to the Traitors. Each question offered two possible answers, represented by scarecrows. If the key attached to a chosen scarecrow unlocked a box, it meant the group’s answer matched that of the Traitors. After correctly answering all the questions, the groups reached a field of scarecrows—some of which contained gold bars, and some nothing at all. The players then had to place the collected gold bars in front of one of the players on trial: Anshula, Harsh, Janvi, or Uorfi, to determine who would be saved from murder. ₹14,40,000 was added to the prize pot from this mission. Uorfi received the most gold bars and was ultimately saved from murder that night.
7	₹25,00,000	₹5,00,000	₹48,05,000	Jannat
For this mission, players were randomly paired up. Due to an uneven number of participants, Nikita sat out. Each pair had seven steps between them, and the objective was to drop a bag on one of the steps of their choice within 10 seconds on a step.: Step 1: Add 2 Lakhs to the prize pot; Step 2: Take 10 Lakhs for self; Step 3: Shield for self; Step 4: Add 5 Lakhs to the prize pot; Step 1–3 were mirrored for each individual, but Step 4 was a shared reward. Prior to the attempt, each pair was given just 1 minute to discuss and strategize among themselves.: Jasmin & Sufi: Sufi dropped the bag on Step 2 and took ₹10,00,000 for himself.; Purav & Sudhanshu: Both dropped their bag on Step 4 and added ₹5,00,000 to the prize pot.; Apoorva & Jannat: Jannat dropped the bag on Step 3 and earned Shield for herself.; Anshula & Harsh: Anshula dropped the bag on Step 2 and took ₹10,00,000 for herself.; Elnaaz & Uorfi: Elnaaz dropped the bag on Step 2 and took ₹10,00,000 for herself.; In the end, ₹5,00,000 was added to the prize pot from this mission.
8	₹7,00,000	₹5,00,000	₹53,05,000	None
Prior to this day, the Traitor had secretly poisoned one of the Innocents during the previous night’s party. Over the course of this mission, the players uncover who among them had been murdered. In the first stage, six out of ten players were instructed to drop a clay pot into a well. If green smoke emerged, the player was deemed safe; if red smoke emerged, the player was considered unsafe.: Safe: Anshula, Jannat, Purav; Unsafe: Apoorva, Harsh, Uorfi; In the next stage, the unsafe players and the remaining players (those who hadn’t participated in the pot test) had to walk through a group of "Rudaalis" (professional mourners). If a lady stopped a player, it confirmed their unsafe status.: Safe: Jasmin, Harsh, Nikita, Sudhanshu; Unsafe: Apoorva, Uorfi, Sufi; In the final stage, the confirmed safe players had to guess which of the three unsafe players, Apoorva, Sufi, and Uorfi had been murdered by poison. For every correct guess, ₹1,00,000 would be added to the prize pot.: Purav and Sudhanshu guessed Apoorva; Anshula, Jannat, Jasmin, Harsh, and Nikita guessed Sufi; ₹5,00,000 was added to the prize pot from this mission for 5 out of 7 correct guesses.
9	₹3,50,000	₹2,00,000	₹55,05,000	None
Each player had three lit torches placed behind them. Once blindfolded, players were called one by one to extinguish the torch of the player they trusted the least.: Apoorva, Purav, and Sudhanshu extinguished Harsh's torch.; Uorfi, Nikita, and Jasmin extinguished Apoorva's torch.; Harsh extinguished Jasmin's torch.; Players whose torches were extinguished had to guess who had done so. For every correct guess, ₹50,000 was added to the prize pot.: Jasmin guessed Apoorva; Harsh guessed Apoorva, Nikita, and Purav; Apoorva guessed Jasmin, Harsh, and Uorfi; Apoorva's torches were extinguished first, marking her as the least trusted player. As a result, she was given the responsibility of handing out the Dagger — an advantage that allows its recipient to have their vote counted twice at the 'Circle of Shaq'. ₹2,00,000 was added to the prize pot from this mission for 4 out of 7 correct guesses.
10	₹15,00,000	₹15,00,000	₹70,05,000	None
Players had to collect puzzle pieces scattered across a desert and complete the puzzle within 15 minutes. One player acted as the guide, while the other four searched for the pieces. Two ATVs were provided for use during the search. Once the puzzle was completed, the team had to push the lever to light it up. For successfully completing the mission, ₹15,00,000 was added to the prize pot.

== Reception ==
The Traitors received a generally positive response from audiences and generated early buzz with headline making evictions. Critics praised the show’s glamorous setting and Karan Johar’s engaging hosting style.

Moneycontrol praised the hosting but criticized the "lackluster cast". The Independent characterize the show as more chaotic than the UK version.

== Episodes ==
The Traitors season 1 episodes
No. overall	No. in season	Title	Original release date
1	1	"Episode 1"	12 June 2025
2	2	"Episode 2"	12 June 2025
3	3	"Episode 3"	12 June 2025
4	4	"Episode 4"	19 June 2025
5	5	"Episode 5"	19 June 2025
6	6	"Episode 6"	19 June 2025
7	7	"Episode 7"	26 June 2025
8	8	"Episode 8"	26 June 2025
9	9	"Episode 9"	26 June 2025
10	10	"Episode 10"	3 July 2025

== Aftershows ==
Besides web extras on YouTube, several sets of bonus clips were uploaded onto Prime Video, under the categories "Sach, Shaq aur Secrets" and "The Traitors Uncut".
