= The Perfect Murder (2019 film) =

2019 Indian crime drama film

- Directed by: Vikkramm Chandirramani
- Written by: Vikkramm Chandirramani
- Produced by: Quest Mercury Intermedia
- Starring: Rohan Gandotra; Samvedna Suwalka; Niharica Raizada; Deepak Daryani
- Release date: 30 January 2019
- Running time: 18 minutes
- Country: India
- Language: Hindi

The Perfect Murder is a 2019 urban crime drama short film, written and directed by Vikkramm Chandirramani featuring Rohan Gandotra, Samvedna Suwalka, Niharica Raizada and Deepak Daryani. It was released on 30 January 2019 on the YouTube channel of Quest Mercury and has since crossed 1 million views. A preview of the film was held at The View, Andheri on 26 January 2019.

== Plot ==
Neha (Samvedna Suwalka) is being examined by a doctor (Deepak Daryani) while her husband Kabir (Rohan Gandotra) watches. She is the heiress of a very wealthy family and suffers from a heart condition that requires her to take a pill every day. The doctor emphasizes that this pill is the best medication for a bad heart. Neha has to go to London that week urgently on business but the doctor dissuades her. Kabir is an aspiring actor and has been badgering Neha to invest in a film to launch him and Neha's father has a poor opinion of Kabir. Neha humiliates Kabir and asks him to focus on the family business.

Kabir leaves and goes to the home of Carol (Niharica Raizada). He has been cheating on Neha with Carol promising her marriage. Carol gives Kabir an ultimatum and suggests that he murder his wife so they can come into a fortune and get married. He asks for some time. Kabir returns home and has a spat with Neha. He apologizes. After they have retired for the day he gets up and starts researching about ways to kill.

A few days later, when Neha reschedules the visit of a plumber because she has to attend the launch of a friend's store. Kabir meets Carol and assures her he will kill Neha. The day arrives and it becomes clear that while Neha is heading to the store launch Kabir is going in a different direction to meet their common friends. A short while after the two head out, Kabir returns alone and poisons one of the pills from the bottle which contains Neha's cardiac medicine. In the midst of this Neha returns home but Kabir has a narrow escape. Will Neha die and will Kabir be able to marry Carol forms the climax.

== Reception ==
The reviewer for The Utah Film Festival and Awards said the film 'immediately captivated' attention and "Vikkramm Chandirramani also made an impeccable choice for a story to depict". Ronita Torcato, writing for The Free Press Journal considered the film worth a watch because of "the acting, the economy of images, the tight editing and the adroitly executed twist in the ending." It won the 'Best Dramatic Film' award at the 2019 NCCC Film and Animation Festival held at Sanborn, Buffalo, NY organized by the Niagara County Community College every year. Vikkramm Chandirramani was given the 'Best Director of a Short Foreign Language Film' award for it at the South Europe International Film Festival held in Valencia, Spain. 'The Perfect Murder' was screened at the Ridgewood Guild International Film Festival, New Jersey, USA. and at the 6th Firenzi FilmCorti Film Festival held in Florence, Italy.
