= Follow Kar Lo Yaar =

- Promotional release poster
- Genre: Reality television
- Directed by: Sandeep Kukreja
- Starring: Urfi Javed
- Country of origin: India
- Original language: Hindi
- No. of episodes: 9

Production
- Producers: Fazilla Allana; Kamna Menezes
- Cinematography: Magesh Madhan
- Camera setup: Multi-camera
- Running time: 28-35 mins
- Production company: SOL Productions

Original release
- Network: Amazon Prime Video
- Release: August 23, 2024

Follow Kar Lo Yaar is an Indian reality television series. Produced by Fazilla Allana and Kamna Menezes under SOL Productions, starring Urfi Javed. It premiered on Amazon Prime Video on 23 August 2024.

== Cast ==
- Urfi Javed
- Urusa Javed
- Asfi Javed
- Dolly Javed
- Sameer Aslam
- Zakiya Sultana
- Sahel Habib Khan
- Sanya Malhotra
- Orhan Awatramani
- Munawar Faruqui

== Production ==
In March 2024, The series was announced on Amazon Prime Video. The trailer of the series was released on 16 August 2024. The premiere event was held on 22 August 2024.

== Reception ==
Mayur Sanap of Rediff.com gave the series 2 stars out of 5. Sana Farzeen for India Today rated the series 3/5 stars. Writing for Hindustan Times, Santanu Das reviewed the series.
