= Everest (Indian TV series) =

2014-15 Indian television series

- Genre: Indian telenovela
- Created by: Ashutosh Gowariker
- Screenplay by: Ashutosh Gowariker; Bhavani Iyer; Mitali Mahajan
- Directed by: Amar Shetty; Ankush Mohla; Glenn Baretto
- Starring: Kishori Shahane; Manish Choudhary; Milind Gunaji; Mohan Kapoor; Rajat Kapoor; Rohan Gandotra; Sahil Salathia; Shamata Anchan; Suhasini Mulay
- Composers: A. R. Rahman; Jerry Silvester Vincent
- Country of origin: India
- Original language: Hindi
- No. of episodes: 102

Production
- Producers: Ashutosh Gowariker; Lawrence D'Souza
- Production locations: India; Nepal
- Cinematography: Alphonse Roy; Mahesh Aney; Piyush Shah
- Editor: Dilip Deo
- Running time: 45-50 minutes 65 minutes (last episode)
- Production company: Ashutosh Gowariker Productions Private Limited (AGPPL)

Original release
- Network: StarPlus
- Release: 3 November 2014 – 1 March 2015

Everest is an Indian Hindi-language telenovela telecast on StarPlus. Directed by Glenn Baretto and Ankush Mohla, Everest is created by Ashutosh Gowariker and produced by Ashutosh Gowariker Productions Private Limited (AGPPL). A. R. Rahman composed the music for the telenovela, which is the television debut of both Gowariker and Rahman, as producer and music composer respectively. Everest was shot in India and Nepal, with shooting locations including the Everest Base Camp (in Nepal) and the Dokriani Glacier (in India), which are located at a height of 17,590 feet (5,360 m) and 12,000 feet (3,700 m) above sea level, respectively. The telenovela was shot in extreme conditions and temperatures.

Everest premiered on STAR Plus on 3 November 2014 and ended its run on 1 March 2015, after airing 102 episodes. The plot revolves around Anjali Singh Rawat's (Shamata Anchan) expedition to climb Mount Everest with Aakash Joshi (Rohan Gandotra) and others. By climbing the summit, Anjali wants to win her father's love while Aakash wants to make a documentary on Arjun Sabharwal (Sahil Salathia), who is on the expedition with them. Prior to its premiere, STAR network employed a series of marketing strategies to help promote the telenovela, one of them being by helping the audience connect to the story by metaphorically interpreting "Everest" to mean an individual's personal journey to overcome struggles. The telenovela also received sponsorships and promotional help from various brands, the news, and the social networking media. Everest involved a high production cost.

== Plot ==
A group of students enrol in the Nehru Institute of Mountaineering, in Uttarkashi, for undergoing training to climb Mount Everest. Anjali Singh Rawat (Shamata Anchan), who feels neglected by her father, wishes to win his love by fulfilling his dream of climbing Everest. Aakash Joshi (Rohan Gandotra) is a videographer, who is to make a documentary on Arjun Sabharwal's (Sahil Salathia) expedition to Everest. As the plot proceeds a relationship between Anjali and Aakash fruitions.

Eight mountaineers — Colonel Arun Abhyankar (Milind Gunaji), Arjun, Aakash, Chaand (Diganta Hazarika) and four sherpas — make their way to Mount Everest after climbing the base camp, while Anjali climbs the base camp alone. In the journey, one sherpa falls in a valley while the mountaineers encounter loose snow near Camp 2. The team is saved from death by Arun, though they encounter constant hurdles owing to lost ropes and oxygen tanks, and snow. The team tries to contact Nasir (Aditya Raj Kapoor) and others, trapped at Camp 4, but they find him near death when they reach the camp.

With favourable weather, Arun decides to resume climb while Aakash remains at Camp 4 for there is insufficient oxygen. The climbers are hit with a dangerous storm, and Arjun leaves for the south summit alone without informing anyone; he had wanted to climb Everest without oxygen. Arjun soon passes out and is buried in snow, though he is found later. He informs of his wish to not continue to mission sponsor, Ramesh Roongta (Rajat Kapoor), who fears damage to his reputation and is furious. At the base camp, Ramesh tells Major Sameer (Mohan Kapoor) of his promise to his shareholders of flying their corporation's flag at the Everest summit.

As Arjun does not wish to continue, Arun tells Tashi and Chaand to prepare to descend, as Ramesh had funded the expedition for Arjun; hence the team cannot continue without Ramesh's permission. Tara loses her life in the ensuing journey and Arun sustains internal injuries at Camp 3. Chaand is asked to lead Aakash and Anjali to the summit. At the Hillary Step, following strong winds, Chaand dies. Soon later, Anjali and Aakash successfully reach the summit.

Anjali waves the Indian flag on the top of the summit, which is live streamed by Aakash. After her success in climbing Mount Everest Anjali received the love and support she wanted from her father

== Cast ==
- Shamata Anchan as Anjali Singh Rawat
- Aditya Raj Kapoor as Nasir Siddiqui
- Armaan Khera as Vidhaan Bharadwaj
- Diganta Hazarika as Chaand Hazarika
- Kishori Shahane as Sarita Rawat
- Manish Choudhary as Brigadier Jagat Singh Rawat
- Milind Gunaji as Colonel Arun Abhyankar
- Mohan Kapoor as Major Sameer Khanna (Sam)
- Naina Trivedi as Maithili
- Rajat Kapoor as Ramesh Roongta
- Jaswinder Gardner as Sakshi Roongta
- Rohan Gandotra as Aakash Joshi
- Sahil Salathia as Arjun Sabharwal
- Simran Judge as Reena Tyagi
- Suhasini Mulay as Shikha Joshi, Aakash's mother
- Surabhi Prabhu as Tara
- Teeshay Shah as Biju

== Production ==
In 2014, Afaqs described Everest as "high on investment", while Gaurav Banerjee, the general manager of STAR Plus, stated Everest to be "a television show at a scale bigger than any other show". The cost of production per episode was ₹35 lakhs. Gowariker had mentioned his interest of giving the television audience a cinematic experience through Everest. It was also reported that Everest led to a delay in Gowariker's film Mohenjo Daro, as he had come up with both concepts at the same time. Produced by Ashutosh Gowariker Productions Private Limited, Everest is Gowariker's television debut as a producer. It was slated to telecast 100 episodes.

The show has been directed by Glenn Baretto and Ankush Mohla, and edited by Dilip Deo. The story along with the series screenplay is written by Mitali Mahajan and Gowariker, while the episodic screenplay is written by Bhavani Iyer. Preeti Mamgain, Lalit Marathe, Manisha Korde, and Mridul have written the dialogues for Everest. Other crew members included Amar Shetty as action director; Aparna Raina as art director; Alphonse Roy, Mahesh Aney and Piyush Shah as cinematographers; Preeti Sharma as costume designer; Vikram Gaikwad as make-up artist; and, Lochan Kanvinde as sound-designer.

The music of Everest is composed by A. R. Rahman, for whom the telenovela is his television debut. Rahman reportedly used tracks created by students from his music college for Everest.

=== Making and shooting ===
Gowariker conceptualised Everest around two years before it was created, combining the themes of women empowerment and of a sport-not-talked-much-about, such as mountaineering. Prior to shooting, the makers researched by referring to books such as To Everest and Beyond by Edmund Hillary, and accounts of various other mountaineers. They also met a few of them personally to collate facts and information.

Accustomed to writing scripts for his movies, Gowariker reportedly found it difficult to write the script for Everest, as in a televisions series the story proceeds after analysing factors such as television viewer ratings and audience feedback; Everest had to be written in one go. In September 2014, Gowariker stated that through Everest he also intended to address the "girl-child issue".

Shooting began in December 2013, and by September 2014 ninety per-cent of the storyline was shot. The crew had to shoot in extreme temperatures and they required additional oxygen to cope with the increasing altitude, making it difficult to shoot. The crew was able to shoot for a maximum of four to five hours a day, increasing the number of shooting days. The shooting also involved a trek in Uttarakhand for ten days. The crew underwent various health tests prior to the shooting.

The telenovela was filmed using equipment such as GoPro cameras and 4K technology. The creators collaborated with the Nehru Institute of Mountaineering in Uttarkashi, Uttarakhand for the shooting, which was done in locations in Nepal such as Lukla and the Everest Base Camp, the latter of which is located at 17,590 feet (5,360 m) above sea level. Shooting locations in India included Pokhran, Jaipur, and Jodhpur in Rajsthan, and Uttarkashi and the Dokriani Glacier in Uttarakhand, the latter of which is located at 12,000 feet (3,700 m) above sea level.

Producers had initially planned to shoot Everest in New Zealand. Before shooting commenced they met Colonel Ajay Kothiyal, principal of the Nehru Institute of Mountaineering, who convinced them to shoot in Uttarkashi, informing them of the availability of required equipments and expertise along with seemingly decreased production costs. The cast and the crew arrived in Dehradun on 6 February 2014, from where they headed to Uttarkashi for the shooting. Consecutively, the training of the cast and crew also began at the Nehru Institute of Mountaineering, following which they headed to the Dokriani glacier and Nepal, latter being where the last shooting of Everest was done. As per schedule, the team wrapped up shooting in Uttarakhand within two months.

== Marketing ==
The promotional for Everest was released on 18 October 2014. Indo-Asian News Service stated Everest being endorsed as "the most ambitious project on Indian television". In an effort to ensure audience connection, the makers interpreted the title Everest to be metaphorical of every individual's personal struggle to overcome hurdles and accomplish something. The trailers of the telenovela resonated with this idea, which were released in the theatres along with the release of the Bollywood film, Happy New Year.

STAR Plus also launched a campaign titled #WhatsYourEverest on radio, television, and social networking sites asking people about their "personal Everest", in collaboration with its presenting sponsor, Fair & Lovely, which launched an initiative to economically assist women. The show was also sponsored by Godrej Ezee and Vinod Cookware. Times of India promoted the show by asking celebrities about their "Everest".

STAR Plus also collaborated with selective outlets of Costa Coffee in India to create a special zone called the "Everest zone" in their cafés, where the temperature was to be approximately 5 °C (41 °F), with waiters serving customers who will be given jackets for protection. This initiative was started in Indian cities on 22 October 2014, and was to reportedly continue throughout working hours for a couple of weekends. Madhok said that this was done to ensure people get an experience of how it feels like to be at Everest. Marketing and promotions was also done by booking two thousand spots and through YouTube, MSN, thirty television channels, and 3-D hoardings. Media planners reported the ad-rate for Everest to be four times more than average regular rates that a television fiction show demands. They also reported that out of the total budget an estimated twenty per-cent was to be spent on marketing.

The launch of the telenovela included crew members from departments such as the department of costume and the department of photography. Nikhil Madhok, the senior vice president of marketing and programming at STAR Plus, said that the telenovela should "break the clutter". Everest premiered on STAR Plus on 3 November 2014.

== Reception ==
The television viewer ratings (TVTs) for Everest's first week stood at 2,845 TVTs. Following its premiere, Everest received negative criticism from Firstpost. Everest ended its run on 1 March 2015, after telecasting 102 episodes. Indiantelevision.com, in 2015, noted that despite high production costs and advanced technology used, shows such as Everest, produced and created by filmmakers, would not make a mark on television until they "reflect the taste and preference of Indian viewers"; such shows would have to "re-orient themselves for television" as "the grammar of storytelling on television is different from films".

In 2017, commenting on the show's run, Shamata Anchan of the cast stated that the show did not do well with regards to television ratings given it being "something new" and stated the same can be worked on by building audience acceptance. The same year, Outlook Business had noted that shows such as Everest "have not exactly been runaway hits on the small screen". Sameer Nair, then CEO of Balaji Telefilms, told Outlook Business that "movie makers have never been successful at making TV shows".

== See also ==
- List of media related to Mount Everest
