= Sahil Salathia =

Indian Actor (born 1978)

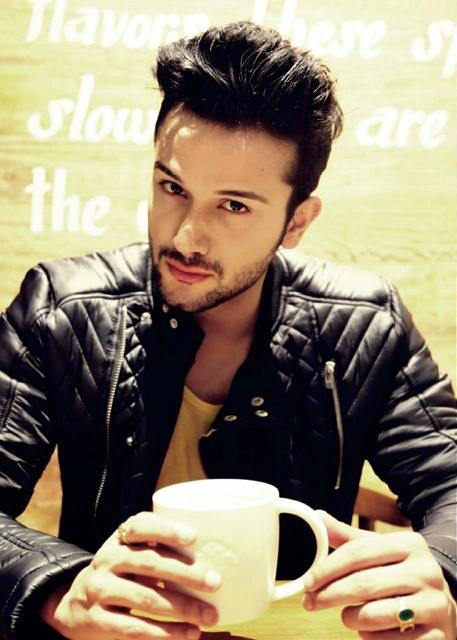
- Sahil Salathia: an interview photo
- Born: 13 April 1988 (age 38); Jammu, India
- Education: Punjab University, Chandigarh
- Occupation: Actor
- Years active: 2015–present

Sahil Salathia is an Indian actor.

== Early life and education ==
Sahil hails from a Dogra Rajput family in Jammu city. He studied at Punjab University, Chandigarh and worked as a software engineer.

== Modeling ==
Sahil represented India at Mr. Asia 2012 in Hong Kong and was a finalist (Top 5) amongst 32 Asian and Euro-Asian countries. Sahil has been the face for many brands and has also done brand campaigns for almost fifty leading brands in India, some of the brands are; Idea Cellular, Tata Indicom, Kingfisher, Big Bazaar and Mercedes Benz, etc. He has also appeared in all the leading magazines such as Maxim, GQ and Hello to name a few, as well as on the cover of India Today and Men's Health India. He has done around 20 commercials in India and abroad. His latest television commercials include Tata Tetley Green Tea, Lava Mobile Phones, Tata Indica, Samsung laptops, Loop mobiles and is continuing.

== Career ==
He made his acting debut, as the male lead in Ashutosh Gowariker's Everest, where he played the character of a celebrated mountaineer called Arjun Sabharwal. He shared about being particularly excited to be represented by the great combo of ace director Ashutosh Gowariker and A. R. Rahman, the Oscar-winning music director who had done the background score for Everest.

Sahil was recently awarded the Best Fresh Face by the Lion Gold Awards for his portrayal of Arjun on screen. He made his Bollywood film debut on the big screen with Ashutosh Gowarikar's Panipat.

== Filmography ==
=== Films ===
Year	Film	Role	Notes
2019	Panipat	Shamsher Bahadur	

=== Television ===
Year	Film	Role	Notes
2014	Everest	Arjun Sabharwal	Protagonist
2016	P.O.W.- Bandi Yuddh Ke	Yusuf Wali Muazzam	Antagonist
2020	Hasmukh	Rahul Kapoor	Special Appearance

=== Web series ===
Year	Film	Role	Notes
2020	Paurashpur	Bhanu	Released on ALTBalaji and ZEE5
2020	Kaun Banegi Shikharwati		Released on ZEE5, Special Appearance
2023	Adhura	Suyash Verma	Prime Video
2024	Honeymoon Photographer	Adhir	JioCinema
2025	The Traitors	Contestant	20th place, Season 1
2026	The Traitors	Contestant	4th place, Season 2

== Social causes ==
Apart from acting and modelling, Sahil is also involved in social causes. In the year 2014, he arranged for a fun filled day for the underprivileged kids from a NGO, Smile Foundation during Christmas.

He also flagged off the "Chal Kar Pahal" walkathon to support gender equality, women empowerment in Bhopal, Lucknow and Chandigarh
