= Best Deal TV =

Indian television channel

- Country: India
- Broadcast area: India
- Headquarters: Mumbai, India

Programming
- Language(s): Hindi
- Picture format: 576i (SDTV)

Ownership
- Owner: Akshay Kumar; Raj Kundra
- Sister channels: Big Deal TV

History
- Launched: 18 March 2015

Availability

Terrestrial
- DD Free Dish: 36

Best Deal TV is a Hindi-language 24/7 home shopping television channel, owned by Akshay Kumar and Raj Kundra. The channel is a free-to-air and launched on 18 March 2015. The channel is available across all major cable and DTH platforms as well as online. The channel is India's first celebrity-driven TV Commerce channel.
