= Bin Kuch Kahe =

2017 Indian comedy-drama television series,

- Genre: Drama/Romance
- Developed by: Rajshree Ojha
- Written by: Satyam Tripathy
- Screenplay by: Atul Dubey; Sameer Satija
- Creative directors: Shrishti Trivedi; Anindita Sinha
- Starring: See Below
- Country of origin: India
- Original language: Hindi
- No. of episodes: 140

Production
- Producer: Rajshree Ojha
- Production location: Jaipur
- Cinematography: Shanu Singh Rajput; Pappu Singh Rajput
- Editor: Rochak Ahuja
- Camera setup: Multi-camera

Original release
- Network: Zee TV
- Release: 6 February – 18 August 2017

Bin Kuch Kahe is an Indian Hindi comedy-drama finite television series, which airs from 6 February 2017 and is broadcast on Zee TV at 6.30 PM (IST). The series is produced by Rajshree Ojha and is set in Jaipur. The series is aired on weekdays' evenings. The show went off air on 18 August 2017 and got by replaced by Zee TV new Horror show Bhootu. The show is broadcasting in South Africa and aired on eBella on Monday 5, March 2018. Shamata Anchan and Sameer Arora are playing the main female and male lead roles respectively.

Bin Kuch Kahe marks the launch of filmmaker Rajshree Ojha as a producer and journalist turned critic Ram Kamal Mukherjee as an associate producer. This finite series is directed by television director Ashish Patil, and Mitesh Chitalia. The casting has been done by casting director Kashyap Chandhock. It has been shot entirely in Jaipur at Zee Studio. The show has been developed and written by Satyam Tripathy who has earlier written the iconic Zee TV shows '12/24 Karol Bagh' and 'Hitler Didi'. The show is about three sisters and their journey in a dysfunctional family, with a troublesome mother, portrayed by television newcomer Archana Mittal.

This 160 episode serial also marks the comeback of Shamata Anchan as main lead after Ashutosh Gwarikar's serial Everest. She is paired opposite model turn actor Sameer Arora. Both Shamata and Sameer has been styled by costume designer from USA, who flew down specially to give them a different look. Noted journalist and former editor of Stardust, Ram Kamal Mukherjee makes his debut as an associate producer. Rajshree Ojha known for her film Aisha with Sonam Kapoor and Abhay Deol, worked almost one year on the subject.

== Plot ==
This is the story of the lives of 3 sisters who live in a dysfunctional family. Abha the eldest runs a canteen called the Kohli Canteen. She has a son called Aryan. Rhea is the second sister who wants to be a rockstar and Myra the youngest wants to be a journalist. This show is completely set in Jaipur.

The soap opera begins with Rhea's engagement to Nikhil. After the engagement, Myra goes to Mumbai after pleading her mom. She goes with her friends for 1 week. There in a bar she meets a charming international journalist named Kabir. They meet almost every day making Myra hate Kabir more. She then has an interview with Zee news for being a journalist. She gets into the job and realizes that Kabir is also a staff of Zee news.

After her interview, she gets a call from Abha saying that Riya has broken the marriage with Nikhil. She gets upset and drinks alcohol. Kabir then helps her and takes her to his house. The next day Myra feels bad about what happened and decides to leave Mumbai without telling anybody. By that time she had got the job. Myra's mom, Sudha Kohli is a very possessive mother and does not allow Myra to go to Mumbai to continue her passion.

Then there is a 1-year jump. It is seen that Myra has got into a local news channel which telecasts insensible news. Rhea sings in the canteen while Abha manages the canteen.

One day Kabir comes to Jaipur for work purpose. There he meets Rhea and becomes good friends with her. She introduces him to the Kohli family which Myra did not like. Myra soon finds out that Kabir is her new boss. Myra hates Kabir and asks Rhea to stay away from Kabir. Kabir helps Rhea with her dreams and she signs into a contract with a famous music company.

== Cast ==
- Shamata Anchan as Myra Kohli
- Sameer Arora as Kabir Miranda
- Rashmi Somvanshi as Abha Kohli
- Nikhil Sabharwal as Akshay Sharma
- Bharat Sharma as Sandeepan Iyer
- Danish Hussain as Vivek Shekhawat
- Archana Mittal as Sudha Kohli
- Nirvana Sawhney as Rhea Kohli
- Shivam Sood as Nikhil Sharma
- Karan Pahuja as Mr. Sharma
- Madhu Anand Chandhock as Mrs. Sharma
- Krish Chauhan as Aryan Kohli
- Suzanne Bernert as Simone Miranda
- Sanjay Gurbaxani as Mr. Miranda
