= UT69 =

- Official release poster
- Directed by: Shahnawaz Ali
- Written by: Vikram Bhatti
- Produced by: Kripa Jaising
- Starring: Raj Kundra; Kumar Saurabh; Ganesh Deokar
- Cinematography: Kevin Jason Crasta
- Edited by: Shahnawaz Ali
- Production companies: SVS Studios; The Bigger Picture
- Distributed by: AA Films
- Release date: 3 November 2023 (india)
- Country: India
- Language: Hindi

UT69 is a 2023 Indian Hindi-language biographical film written by Raj Kundra and directed by Shahnawaz Ali. The film was produced by Kripa Jaising under the banner of SVS Studios and The Bigger Picture.

== Cast ==
- Raj Kundra
- Kumar Saurabh as Ashraf
- Ganesh Deokar as Amar
- Mahesh Ghag as Jacob

== Release ==
UT69 was released theatrically on 3 November 2023.

== Reception ==
Monika Rawal Kukreja of Hindustan Times said "All said and done, UT 69 doesn't have a clear plot or a story that it wants you to understand, absorb and take back home with you".

Shubhra Gupta of The Indian Express rated this film one out of five stars and said "The trouble with this two-hour-long tale is that instead of digging into details of the accusation—producing pornographic material– that lands Kundra in Mumbai’s Arthur Jail, where he has to stay for 63 days without bail, is that it is just one long litany of woes".

Abhishek Srivastava of The Times of India rated this film 2 1/2 out of 5 stars and said "'UT69' takes a different path, utilizing humour to a degree that dilutes the overall impact. In retrospect, one can't help but wish that the filmmakers had embraced the more gritty and brutal elements, which could have elevated the film to a higher level of authenticity and resonance".

Zinia Bandyopadhyay of The Free Press Journal rated this film 3 1/2 out of 5 stars and said "All in all no one will miss this film, a must watch film. ‘UT 69” will set a unique example in the minds of Human Right Authorities and all concerned within its premise. And they will surely work towards bringing reformations in our jails and treat the accused not like animals but like human beings".

Simran Singh of DNA India rated this film three out of five stars and said "UT69 will surprise you as it gives a closer look at the life of jail inmates, and you might feel privileged to have basic amenities and live a free life."
