= 1962: The War in the Hills =

2021 Indian web series by Mahesh Manjrekar

- Promotional poster
- Genre: War Drama
- Written by: Mahesh Manjrekar
- Directed by: Mahesh Manjrekar
- Starring: Abhay Deol; Sumeet Vyas; Akash Thosar; Rohan Gandotra; Mahie Gill; Pawandeep Rajan
- Composer: Hitesh Modak
- Country of origin: India
- Original language: Hindi
- No. of seasons: 1
- No. of episodes: 10

Production
- Producer: Ajay Chacko
- Production location: India
- Cinematography: Karan B. Rawat
- Editor: Sarvesh Parab
- Production company: Arre Studios

Original release
- Network: Disney+ Hotstar
- Release: 26 February 2021

1962: The War in the Hills is an Indian Hindi-language war drama television series on Disney+ Hotstar, written and directed by Mahesh Manjrekar. Inspired by the 1962 Sino-Indian war, the series features Abhay Deol, Sumeet Vyas, Rohan Gandotra, Mahie Gill and Akash Thosar in leading roles. The series showcases a fictional account of real battles fought in Galwan Valley and Rezang La where 125 Ahir soldiers of the Indian Army were tasked with defending against a 3000 strong People's Liberation Army

The series released on 26 February 2021 on Disney+ Hotstar and received mostly mixed reviews from critics, who criticized its long run time and visual effects.

== Plot ==
The official synopsis reads,

Inspired by true events, 1962: The War In The Hills is a fictional take about one of the fiercest battles ever fought. 124 Indian soldiers of ‘C Company’ of an Indian army battalion fought 3000 Chinese to the last man and last bullet; led by their leader Major Suraj Singh Hailing from the village of Rewari, this is also a story about their personal battles, their life beyond their uniforms and their times of love, heartbreak, longing and celebration. They band together in the harshest battlefield and hold up a strategic pass that stopped the infiltrating army from taking over a prime airstrip fighting till their last breath to protect what truly belonged to the nation – Ladakh.

== Cast ==
- Abhay Deol as Major Suraj Singh, a character inspired by Major Shaitan Singh
- Sumeet Vyas as Jemadar Ram Kumar
- Akash Thosar as Sepoy Kishan Yadav
- Mahie Gill as Ms. Shagun Singh, wife of Suraj Singh, inspired by Shaitan Singh's wife Ms. Shagun Kanwar
- Arif Zakaria as Pt. Jawaharlal Nehru
- Geetika Vidya Ohlyan as Indira Gandhi
- Kishore Nandlaskar as Dak Chacha
- Pooja Sawant as Padma
- Rohan Gandotra as Sepoy Karan Yadav
- Vineet Sharma as Subedar Hardam Singh Yadav
- Jay Parab as Sepoy Nakul
- Satya Manjrekar as Sepoy Gopal Yadav
- Sanjay Dadich as Mohan Yadav
- Prem Dharmadhikari (child) as Raju Yadav
- Meiyang Chang as Major Lin
- Bijou Thaangjam as a Chinese soldier
- Liao Meng Chi as Ug Lee
- Divyansh Mishra as a young boy
- Anup Soni as Major Khattar
- Karim Hajee as General Singha
- Rochelle Rao as Rimpa
- Jaideep Singh Sehmbi as Sepoy Vishal Sardar
- Meenal Kapoor as Neelam (daughter of Major Suraj Singh and Shagun Singh
- Diganta Hazarika as Pema
- Pallavi Kulkarni as Jaya
- Sammaera Jaiswal as young Neelam (Daughter of Major Suraj Singh and Mrs. Shagun Singh)
- Pawandeep Rajan as Nido Tana "Radar"
- Medha Manjrekar as Radha's Mom
- Shiv Subramaniam as Mr. Krishna
- Shivamprasad Pandit as Masterji
- Hemal Ingle as Radha

== Episodes ==
No.	Title	Directed by	Written by	Original release date
1	"Hindi Cheeni Bhai Bhai?"	Mahesh Manjrekar	Mahesh Manjrekar	26 February 2021
In 1962, Major Suraj Singh of the Kumaon Regiment acquires critical intelligence from the border. Meanwhile, the soldiers in his unit deal with friendship, love, rivalry and marriage.
2	"Love and War"	Mahesh Manjrekar	Mahesh Manjrekar	26 February 2021
India learns about China's expansionist plans. Back in Rewari, a love triangle implodes when Radha chooses Kishan over Karan.
3	"1 Step Forward, 2 Steps Backward"	Mahesh Manjrekar	Mahesh Manjrekar	26 February 2021
While India goes ahead with the Forward Policy, the Chinese depute Major Lin to lead their offensive. At the same time, Rewari is all set for Sepoy Gopal's wedding.
4	"Ceasefire?"	Mahesh Manjrekar	Mahesh Manjrekar	26 February 2021
Suraj's meticulous planning bears fruit when they recapture Tooka Post. However, the victory is short-lived and the situation goes downhill.
5	"Independence Day"	Mahesh Manjrekar	Mahesh Manjrekar	26 February 2021
Hardham takes an extreme step to seek justice for Gopal. Later, when Radha's parents decide to fix her marriage to Karan, Jaya spills the beans about Kishan.
6	"At War"	Mahesh Manjrekar	Mahesh Manjrekar	26 February 2021
As border tensions intensify, war becomes inevitable. Back in Rewari, Ram Kumar opens up about his wife and Radha goes on a hunger strike.
7	"Road to Shaksa La"	Mahesh Manjrekar	Mahesh Manjrekar	26 February 2021
Major Khattar sends C Company to Shaksa La, and the only way to reach the post is on foot. Soon they realise that courage is not enough to manoeuvre the difficult terrain.
8	"Vidhur Ashram"	Mahesh Manjrekar	Mahesh Manjrekar	26 February 2021
Knowing her secret, Suraj refuses to leave Shagun, but she convinces him to go to Chuhul HQ. Moreover, no one but Suraj believes the Chinese will attack from Shaksa La.
9	"The Last Stand"	Mahesh Manjrekar	Mahesh Manjrekar	26 February 2021
Radar returns injured and bloody to Chuhul HQ and recounts the events that took place in Shaksa La. Back home, Jaya and Shagun have to fight their families and their demons.
10	"Escape to Victory"	Mahesh Manjrekar	Mahesh Manjrekar	26 February 2021
The ceasefire is declared at a heavy cost. The soldiers' families mourn them, but Radha believes Kishan is alive. Meanwhile, Rinpa sees someone unexpected at the Chinese camp.

== Production ==
=== Development ===
In July 2019, Hotstar had announced its collaboration with Arre Studios to produce a new series showcasing the life of soldiers, based on the backdrop of the Sino-Indian war happened in 1962 and roped in Mahesh Manjrekar to direct the series. A source from the online portal Peeping Moon stated that Abhay Deol will act in the series as Major Shaitan Singh who was the frontrunner of the Indian Army during that period. The team kickstarted the casting process in the very same month which was ended in August 2019. It was touted to be one of the most costliest Hotstar original productions. The series producer Ajay Chacko stated that "We haven’t treated the series as an OTT show but three feature films rolled into one. It took us about two-and-half years from the inception to finish. It’s not an ordinary show, but one with many firsts."

=== Casting ===
The project came into news in mid-November 2019 with Abhay Deol being confirmed as the lead actor in the series. Sumeet Vyas and Akash Thosar were also confirmed to play the pivotal characters in the series. Thosar stated that he eventually wanted to join the Indian Army since he was passionate in the profession during his childhood, but as it failed to happen, he eventually became an actor. Thosar stated that he was about to play a fictional soldier which he stated it as his "dream come true moment". He further stated that he had to gain 10 kilos for his role and also performed stunts for the first time. Vyas also stated that the biggest challenge in the series is doing stunt sequences, since he was initially a part of comedy and romantic genre series. In February 2021, Mahie Gill was announced to pair opposite Abhay Deol as Shagun Singh's wife. This marked their reunion of Deol and Gill after the 2009 film Dev.D.

=== Filming ===
Shooting of the series began in September 2019. As the series required stunts and action sequences, the production team roped in Don Lee, an internationally acclaimed stunt choreographer who is known for films such as Pirates of the Caribbean and Star Trek for the stunts. Most of the series were shot in Ladakh and Panchgani. Actor Rohan Gandotra about the shooting in Ladakh eventually stated that it was a surreal experience and he also had developed health issues citing shoot in high altitude. He stated that " Shooting in high terrain can be a challenge, especially with harsh weather conditions. But we trained really well and once we got to the shoot, everything made sense. It made me wonder — if we find it so tough to shoot for a few days, imagine what our soldiers go through on a daily basis." By December 2019, the makers had wrapped the shoot and entered post-production which has been completed few days before the COVID-19 pandemic lockdown in March 2020 was announced.

== Soundtrack ==
1962: The War In The Hills

Soundtrack album by Hitesh Modak
- Released: 19 February 2021
- Recorded: 2020–2021
- Genre: Soundtrack
- Length: 44:55
- Language: Hindi
- Label: Disney+ Hotstar
- Producer: Hitesh Modak

Hitesh Modak chronology
Jinde Meriye (2020)	1962: The War In The Hills (2021)

Singles from 1962: The War In The Hills
- 1. "Hum Shaan Se Jalne Nikle Hai" Released: 5 February 2021

The soundtrack and score is composed by Hitesh Modak and lyrics for the soundtrack album were penned by Lavraj. The music video for the first song "Hum Shaan Se Jalne Nikle Hai" was released first on 5 February 2021. The entire soundtrack featuring 11 songs have been released on 19 February 2021. The album features vocals by Hitesh Modak, Vijay Prakash, Salman Ali, Sukhwinder Singh, Farhad Bhiwandiwala, Aanandi Joshi, Shailey Bidwaikar, Shamika Bhide, Susmirata Dawalkar, Maanuni Desai and Sanket Naik.

All lyrics are written by Lavraj.

No.	Title	Singer(s)	Length
1.	"Hum Shaan Se Jalne Nikle Hai"	Vijay Prakash, Salman Ali	8:57
2.	"Moh Ki Dori"	Sukhwinder Singh, Aanandi Joshi	3:50
3.	"Black Turtle"	Hitesh Modak	3:25
4.	"Hum Shaan Se Jalne Nikle Hai" (Rap)	Hitesh Modak, Farhad Bhiwandiwala	1:13
5.	"Ladli Tu"	Shailey Bidwaikar	0:46
6.	"Soja Meri Aankhon Ke Taare"	Shailey Bidwaikar	7:29
7.	"Moh Ki Dori" (Sad Version)	Hitesh Modak, Aanandi Joshi	7:24
8.	"1962: Opening Credit"	Hitesh Modak, Maanuni Desai	0:44
9.	"Vaishnav Jan To"	Hitesh Modak, Shamika Bhide, Susmirata Dawalkar	3:21
10.	"Vande Mataram"	Hitesh Modak, Shailey Bidwaikar, Sanket Naik	3:52
11.	"Mere Sau Karam Tere Shaan Pe Qurbaan Hai"	Shailey Bidwaikar	2:54

== Release ==
Originally planned for a 2021 release, the series was advanced for a November 2020 release as the 13th edition of the Indian Premier League will end on this month. It is mostly due to the anti-Chinese sentiment prevailing in India after the Galwan Valley disputes happened in June 2020. However the slated release did not happen due to certain reasons. On 26 January 2021, coinciding with Republic Day, the first look of the series was released through social media platforms which featured references to the 2020 Galwan Valley clash. The official trailer of the series was released on YouTube on 12 February 2021. The series premiered through Disney+ Hotstar on 26 February 2021.

== Reception ==
Saibal Chatterjee of NDTV gave two-and-a-half out of five stars and stated "The depiction of the titular war just about passes muster. The women who embody the tragic consequences of military conflict steal the show and nudge it into an unusual orbit, making 1962: The War In The Hills far more watchable than it would otherwise have been." Kirti Tulsiani of Zoom TV gave two-and-a-half out of five stars and stated "The show, in that regard, is a must-watch as it humanises soldiers in the day and age where people often end up using their stories as tokens of patriotism on social media. However, there are flaws too. If you are ready to overlook the dramatisation of many moments and also expect some creative liberties, then 1962: The War in the Hills is a show you can watch."

Ektaa Malik of The Indian Express gave one-out of five stars saying "the show pretends to be a period piece, but fails miserably". Rohan Naahar writing for Hindustan Times panned the series describing "Shrill, tacky, and jaw-droppingly amateurish, Abhay Deol's Hotstar war drama is the worst show on a mainstream Indian platform." Jyoti Kanyal of India Today wrote "1962: The War On The Hills is a highly disappointing war drama. The plot is not engaging, you cannot empathise with any of the characters, and to top it all, there's no adherence to any logic."
