= Rohan Gandotra =

Indian television actor

- Born: 26 August 1990 (age 35); Delhi, India
- Occupation: Actor
- Years active: 2014–present
- Known for: Everest; Kaala Teeka; Dil Se Dil Tak

Rohan Gandotra (born 26 August 1990) is an Indian television actor who debuted with Everest and then appeared in shows like Qubool Hai, Kaala Teeka, Naagin 2, Dil Se Dil Tak, Silsila Badalte Rishton Ka and 1962: The War in the Hills

== Early life ==
Rohan Gandotra was born on 26 August 1990 in New Delhi, india into a Punjabi Hindu family to Sunil Gandotra and Meenakshi Gandotra. He has an elder brother Prateek Gandotra. Gandotra completed his schooling from DLDAV Model School, New Delhi. Gandotra completed Bachelors in Computers from Jagan Institute of Management Studies.

Rohan inspired to be an actor since his college days when he started modelling at college festivals and then he started appearing in lot of print shoots for different brands. There are over 40 plus different brands in his kitty for what he shot including Casio, Vodafone, Tata Docomo, Hyundai Eon, Hair and care etc. After doing a lot of print shoots and tvc’s he started concentrating on his acting career.

== Career ==
Rohan made his acting debut on television with a lead role as Aakash Joshi on Ashutosh Gowariker's Everest on StarPlus produced by AGPPL in 2014. He gained recognition for his role as Akash Joshi that earned him Best Debut at the prestigious Gold Awards and a nomination as the Best Fresh New Face (Male) in Indian Telly Awards. The show is available on Hotstar to watch. In 2015, he did a cameo role in Zee TV’s Qubool Hai as Ashfaq, co-starring alongside Additi Gupta and Surbhi Jyoti. In 2016, he joined Zee TV’s show Kaala Teeka after leap in which he played a charming young businessman as Yug Chaudhary. Show successfully ran for 1.5 yrs before he quit the show.

In November 2017, he was signed as the replacement of Sidharth Shukla in Colors TV most famous show Dil Se Dil Tak opposite Jasmin Bhasin and Rashami Desai. The show was produced by Shashi Sumeet Productions. He played the character of Parth Bhanushali. The series ended in June 2018. In Feb 2019, Rohan signed a new show for Voot in Silsila Badalte Rishton Ka second season as Veer Verma opposite Tejasswi Prakash, Kunal Jaisingh and Aneri Vajani. The show was the first daily soap to run on an OTT platform. The show went on for 100 episodes and ended in June 2019.

Immediately after the show, Gandotra signed his new show for Hotstar called 1962: The War in the Hills directed by Mahesh Manjrekar, produced by Arre (brand). The show has an ensemble cast of Abhay Deol, Sumeet Vyas, Akash Thosar, Mahie Gill, Pooja Sawant. This is one of the biggest show for Hotstar and received rave reviews from the critics as well as audience. The show is based on Indo-China war of 1962. Gandotra played the character of Sepoy Karan Yadav for which he gained 7kgs to look the part of a ruthless soldier. He received amazing reviews for his performance as a soldier. In 2021, he appeared in StarPlus's show Zindagi Mere Ghar Aana as Yuvraj Singh.

== Personal life ==
In 2018, it was reported by The Times of India that Gandotra was secretly dating actress Hiba Nawab, though both of them denied the claims in media. Since 2021, Gandotra has been frequently linked with actress and business partner Chahatt Khanna, with reports suggesting they are in a relationship. Khanna has referred to him as a "special part of [her] life".

== Filmography ==
=== Television ===
Year	Title	Role	Notes	Ref
2014	Everest	Aakash Joshi	Main role	
2015	Twist Wala Love	Rohan/Vishal		
2015	Fear Files	Kabir	Episodic	
2015–2016	Qubool Hai	Ehsaan Raza Sheikh	Supporting role	
2016–2017	Kaala Teeka	Yug Choudhary	Main role	
2017	Dhhai Kilo Prem	Aman		
2017	Naagin 2	Anshuman		
2017–2018	Dil Se Dil Tak	Parth Bhanushali	Replaced Sidharth Shukla/ main role	
2018	Laal Ishq	Ashwak Khan	Episodic	
2019	The Perfect Murder	Kabir	Short Film	
2019	Silsila Badalte Rishton Ka	Veer Verma		
2021	Zindagi Mere Ghar Aana	Yuvraj Singh	An N.R.I.	

=== Special appearance ===
Year	Title	Role	Ref
2018	Tu Aashiqui	Parth Bhanushali	
2018	Laado 2 – Veerpur Ki Mardani	Parth Bhanushali	
2018	Belan Wali Bahu	Parth Bhanushali	
2018	Udaan	Parth Bhanushali	

=== Web series ===
Year	Title	Role	Notes
2021	1962: The War in the Hills	Karan Yadav	
2021	Karrle Tu Bhi Mohabbat	Rohan	
2022	Aai		Short Film
2025	Jackpot	Lucky	
2026	Hasratein 3	Rishabh	
