= The Traitors (Hindi TV series) season 2 =

The Traitors
- Season 2
- Presented by: Karan Johar
- No. of contestants: 21
- Winners: Krystle D'Souza; Rida Tharana
- Location: Suryagarh Palace, Jaisalmer, Rajasthan
- No. of episodes: 11

Release
- Original network: Prime Video
- Original release: 13 August – 9 September 2026

Season chronology
- ← Previous; Season 1

The second season of The Traitors premiered on Prime Video on 13 August 2026, with Karan Johar returning as the host. The season concluded on 3 September 2026, with Krystle D'Souza and Rida Tharana winning the season as Traitors. The reunion episode streamed on 9 September 2026.

== Format ==
A group of contestants arrive at the palace in Jaisalmer, Rajasthan with hopes of winning a large cash prize of ₹1 crore that is built up through missions. The players are referred to as the "Innocents", but among them are the "Traitors" — a group of contestants secretly selected by the host. If the Innocents eliminate all the Traitors, they will share the prize fund. However, if any Traitors manage to make it to the end, eliminating the Innocents, they win the entire prize money.

This season also introduced a new pet companion for Karan, a grey Persian cat named ‘Boo’ - a supposed bearer of bad news for the contestants.

The contestants participate in missions to build up their cash prize. In some missions, any contestant may also win a ‘shield’ that grants them immunity from the subsequent murder.

On most nights, The Traitors meet in a secret tower to decide on an Innocent contestant to ‘murder,’ who is then immediately eliminated from the game. The remaining Innocents are unaware of who has been eliminated until the following morning, when that person fails to appear at the breakfast table in the castle.

At the end of each day, the players gather at the ‘Circle of Shaq,’ where they discuss whom to vote out before individually casting their votes. Players vote privately, then reveal their choices one by one, often giving a brief rationale for their decision. The player who receives the most votes is banished from the game and reveals their affiliation. If during the game the number of ‘Traitors’ drops to two, they are given the choice to recruit an Innocent to join them instead of murdering.

After the final Circle of Shaq, the remaining players participate in the End Game. The group are given an opportunity to end the game by unanimous vote. Any vote to continue will lead to another immediate banishment vote. When a unanimous decision is reached to end the game — or when there are only two players left — the remaining players reveal their affiliation. If all remaining players are Innocents, then the prize money is divided evenly among them. However, if any Traitors remain, they win the entire prize money.

== Production ==
On 25 June 2026, the show was renewed for a second season. The first teaser was released on July 27, 2026, which revealed the premiere date of August 13, 2026, and the first two contestants joining the show, comedian Munawar Faruqui and actress Mallika Sherawat.

The BBC acquired streaming rights for the show after the success of the first season.

== Contestants ==
21 contestants competed on the second series of The Traitors. Sahil Salathia returned from season 1.

Dalip, Ikka, and Prish took a separate route upon arriving at the castle and were instead sent directly to the first mission, where they were suspended in cages. Karan announced that only two of them could be saved. Following the mission, Ikka and Prish were rescued, while Dalip was eliminated. However, Dalip later re-entered the show in Episode 4.

List of The Traitors 2 contestants
Contestant	Age	Notability	Affiliation	Finish
Karan Singh	35	Mentalist	Innocent	Murdered (Episode 2)
Munawar Faruqui	34	Stand-up comedian	Innocent	Banished (Episode 2)
Soundous Moufakir	31	Actor	Innocent	Murdered (Episode 3)
Harman Singha	38	Actor	Traitor	Banished (Episode 3)
Ranveer Brar	48	Celebrity chef	Innocent	Murdered (Episode 4)
Parul Gulati	32	Actor & entrepreneur	Innocent	Banished (Episode 5)
Abhishek Malhan "Fukra Insaan"	29	YouTuber	Innocent	Murdered (Episode 6)
Aaditya "Kullu" Kulshreshth	29	Stand-up comedian	Traitor	Banished (Episode 6)
Shweta Tiwari	45	Actor	Innocent	Murdered (Episode 7)
Shahneel Gill	28	Lifestyle creator	Innocent	Banished (Episode 7)
Shahneel Gill	28	Lifestyle creator	Traitor (from ep. 2)	Banished (Episode 7)
Tanya Puri	31	Private detective	Innocent	Murdered (Episode 8)
Ikka Singh	37	Rapper	Innocent	Murdered (Episode 8)
Rhea Chakraborty	34	Actor & entrepreneur	Innocent	Banished (Episode 8)
Prish	22	Content creator	Innocent	Murdered (Episode 9)
Ansh Chopra	28	Content creator	Innocent	Banished (Episode 9)
Mallika Sherawat	49	Actor	Innocent	Murdered (Episode 10)
Dalip Tahil	73	Actor	Innocent	Banished (Episode 10)
Sahil Salathia	38	Actor	Innocent	Banished (Episode 10)
Shalini Passi	49	Artist & philanthropist	Innocent	Banished (Episode 10)
Rida Tharana	27	Content creator	Innocent	Winner (Episode 10)
Rida Tharana	27	Content creator	Traitor (from ep. 8)	Winner (Episode 10)
Krystle D'Souza	36	Actor	Traitor	Winner (Episode 10)

== Elimination history ==
Key

The contestant was an Innocent.
The contestant was a Traitor.
The contestant was murdered by the Traitors.
The contestant was banished at the round table.
The contestant was immune for the banishment and subsequent murder.

Episode	1	2	3	4/5		6	7	8			9	10
Traitor's decision	Shahneel	Karan	Soundous	Ranveer		Abhishek	Shweta	Rida	Tanya	Ikka	Prish	Mallika
Traitor's decision	Recruit (offer accepted by Shahneel) (Note: The Traitors, Harman, Krystle, and Kullu were given the opportunity to recruit a remaining Traitor. They choose Shahneel.)	Murder		Murder (by game of death) (Note: The Traitors Krystle, Kullu, and Shahneel were given a secret mission to choose four players to play the ‘Game of Death’ in plain sight by writing their names on a hanging portrait of Death in the billiards room. They chose Ansh, Krystle, Ranveer, and Shalini. In the game, the players were given cards, with only one being a ‘Life Card’. In each round, the players switched cards, and the player holding the ‘Life Card’ was safe from murder. Ansh and Shalini saved themselves in successive rounds, respectively. In the final round, the two remaining players, Krystle and Ranveer, had to pick a card, with seven of the eight cards being ‘Life Cards’ and one being the ‘Death Card’. Krystle picked a ‘Life Card’, while Ranveer picked the ‘Death Card’, lost the game, and was murdered.)		Murder		Blackmail (offer accepted by Rida) (Note: Following Shahneel’s banishment, Krystle was given the opportunity to blackmail an Innocent into becoming a Traitor or be Murdered. She chose Rida, who possessed a shield and was therefore protected from being Murdered; however, despite this, she accepted the offer.)	Murder	Murder (by curse) (Note: The Traitors Krystle and Rida were given a secret mission to murder a player in plain sight by cursing them. They had to tear the chosen player’s image from a book and place it in a hidden drawer behind Boo’s portrait. The victim’s identity would be revealed during the following mission with a minor twist.)	Murder	
Shield	Kullu; Munawar	Abhishek; Ansh; Kullu; Ranveer	Kullu; Shahneel	Krystle; Rhea		Rida	Ikka; Mallika; Rida	Mallika; Rida; Rhea			Shalini	None
Banishment	Not; Introduced	Munawar	Harman	Tie (Note: The following ‘Circle of Shaq’ aired in Episode 5.) (Note: The first round of voting resulted in a tie. Per the rules, a second vote was held where the players involved in the tie would not vote and the remaining players could only vote for those who tied.)	Parul	Kullu	Shahneel	Rhea			Ansh	Dalip
Vote	Not; Introduced	11–4–3–1	8–7–1–1	5–5–2–1–1–1	7–6	8–4–1–1–1	11–1	8–1			4–2–1–1	4–1
Krystle	No; Vote	Tanya	Ranveer	Mallika	Not eligible	Kullu	Shahneel	Rhea			Ansh	Dalip
Rida	No; Vote	Munawar	Harman	Parul	Parul	Kullu	Shahneel	Rhea			Sahil	Dalip
Sahil	No; Vote	Munawar	Ranveer	Parul	Parul	Kullu; Kullu†	Shahneel	Rhea			Ansh	Dalip
Shalini	No; Vote	Munawar	Harman	Rhea	Parul	Kullu	Shahneel	Rhea			Ansh	Dalip
Dalip	Exiled (Note: Dalip, Ikka, and Prish took a separate route upon arriving at the castle and were instead sent directly to the first mission, where they were suspended in cages. Karan announced that only two of them could be saved. Following the mission, Ikka and Prish were rescued, while Dalip was eliminated.) (Episode 1)			Not; Eligible		Shalini	Shahneel	Rhea			Ansh	Rida
Mallika	No; Vote	Munawar	Ranveer	Krystle	Krystle	Tanya	Shahneel	Rhea			Rida; Rida†	Murdered (Episode 10)
Ansh	No; Vote	Munawar	Harman	Tanya	Krystle	Kullu	Shahneel	Rhea			Shalini	Banished (Episode 9)
Prish	No; Vote	Munawar	Harman	Sahil	Krystle	Kullu	Shahneel	Rhea			Murdered (Episode 9)	
Rhea	No; Vote	Tanya	Ranveer	Krystle	Krystle	Sahil	Shahneel	Mallika			Banished (Episode 8)	
Ikka	No; Vote	Ranveer	Ranveer	Parul	Parul	Kullu	Shahneel	Murdered (Episode 8)				
Tanya	No; Vote	Mallika	Harman	Krystle	Krystle	Krystle	Shahneel	Murdered (Episode 8)				
Shahneel	No; Vote	Munawar	Parul	Parul	Parul	Sahil	Tanya	Banished (Episode 7)				
Shweta	No; Vote	Tanya	Harman	Parul	Krystle	Sahil	Murdered (Episode 7)					
Kullu	No; Vote	Munawar	Ranveer	Krystle	Parul	Sahil	Banished (Episode 6)					
Abhishek	No; Vote	Munawar	Harman	Rhea	Parul	Murdered (Episode 6)						
Parul	No; Vote	Mallika	Harman	Krystle	Not eligible	Banished (Episode 5)						
Ranveer	No; Vote	Tanya	Mallika	Murdered (Episode 4)								
Harman	No; Vote	Munawar	Ranveer	Banished (Episode 3)								
Soundous	No; Vote	Munawar	Murdered (Episode 3)									
Munawar	No; Vote	Mallika	Banished (Episode 2)									
Karan	No; Vote	Murdered (Episode 2)										

=== End game ===
Decision	Banish	Sahil	Banish	Shalini	Game; Ended
Vote	4–0	3–1	2–1	2–1	Game; Ended
Krystle	Shaq	Sahil	Trust	Shalini	Winner
Rida	Shaq	Sahil	Trust	Shalini	Winner
Shalini	Shaq	Sahil	Shaq	Rida	Banished
Sahil	Shaq	Rida	Banished		
Dalip	Banished				

== Missions ==
Episode	Money available	Money earned	Total pot	Shield
1	₹12,00,000	₹10,40,000	₹10,40,000	Kullu
1	₹12,00,000	₹10,40,000	₹10,40,000	Munawar
Three players—Dalip, Ikka and Prish were suspended in cages. Karan announced that only two of them could be saved. The players had to find ‘Potli’ bags that contains a gold coin worth ₹20,000, and place the coins into one of three tubes corresponding to the player they wanted to release. They also had shields, which they could give to any player of their choice upon being rescued. Following the mission, Ikka and Prish were rescued, while Dalip was eliminated.
2	₹12,00,000	₹10,00,000	₹20,40,000	Abhishek
2	₹12,00,000	₹10,00,000	₹20,40,000	Ansh
2	₹12,00,000	₹10,00,000	₹20,40,000	Kullu
2	₹12,00,000	₹10,00,000	₹20,40,000	Ranveer
Team Blue: Harman, Ikka, Krystle, Mallika, Munawar, Sahil, Shahneel, Shalini, and Shweta; Team Red: Abhishek, Ansh, Kullu, Parul, Prish, Ranveer, Rhea, Rida, Soundous, and Tanya; Split into two groups, the players had to push a cannon cart along a designated path while collecting gold bars worth ₹2,00,000 and gunpowder from three pit stop. Each team had to leave two players behind at each pit stop. The team that crossed the finish line first earns a shield for each of its remaining players.
3	₹12,00,000	₹8,00,000	₹28,40,000	Kullu
3	₹12,00,000	₹8,00,000	₹28,40,000	Shahneel
The traitors had to secretly choose two players who they would like to give the shield, they chose Ansh and Mallika. For this mission, the players split themselves into six groups, with each group entering the museum in an order chosen by the players. Each group had the option to switch a player’s portrait on the “Wall of Shield” with the portrait of any player of their choice. However, doing so would cost ₹1,00,000. They also had to stab one player’s portrait, eliminating them from the race to win the shield. At the end of the mission, the two players whose portraits remained on the “Wall of Shield” would earn the shields.: Group 1: Krystle, Shalini and Shweta; Shield: Ansh and Mallika (Unchanged); Stabbed: Ranveer; Group 2: Parul, Prish and Rida; Shield: Ansh and Mallika (Unchanged); Stabbed: Sahil; Group 3: Mallika and Tanya; Shield: Ansh and Mallika (Unchanged); Stabbed: Parul; Group 4: Abhishek, Harman and Rhea; Shield: Abhishek and Rhea (Swapped Ansh and Mallika); Stabbed: Ansh; Group 5: Ansh, Kullu and Ranveer; Shield: Abhishek and Kullu (Swapped Rhea); Stabbed: Ikka; Group 6: Ikka, Sahil and Shahneel; Shield: Kullu and Shahneel (Swapped Abhishek); Stabbed: Tanya
4	₹10,00,000	₹8,00,000	₹36,40,000	Rhea
4	₹10,00,000	₹8,00,000	₹36,40,000	Krystle
The players had to mutually select three players, Kullu, Shahneel and Rida who would be ineligible to win the Shield and would answer questions that had been answered by the Traitors the previous night. Each correct answer earned the players a gold bar worth ₹2,00,000 for the prize pot. The remaining players had to open the corresponding boxes one by one. If a player opened a box containing an incorrect answer, they would be out of the race for the Shield. The player who opened the box containing the correct answer to the final question won the Shield. Rhea won the Shield during the mission. Dailp re-entered the game with a shield and gave it to Krystle in Episode 5.
6	₹8,00,000	₹0	₹36,40,000	Rida
In this mission, the players had to select eight players and divide them into two teams of four.: Team A: Ansh, Krystle, Kullu and Rida; Team B: Ikka, Prish, Sahil and Shahneel; The teams then competed against each other in pairs, with each pair presented with three options: Option 1: Both players choose gold.; Result: ₹2,00,000 was added to the prize pot.; Option 2: One player chooses gold and the other chooses they key.; Result: The player who chose the key received a key to the Armory.; Option 3: Both players choose the key.; Result: Nothing was awarded.; Following the mission, Prish, Rida, Sahil and Shahneel received keys to the Armory. The Armory contained four chests, two of which were empty. One chest contained the Shield, while another contained a Dagger that caused the holder’s vote to count twice in subsequent ‘Circle of Shaq’. Sahil received the Dagger, while Rida received the Shield.
7	₹12,00,000	₹0	₹36,40,000	Rida
7	₹12,00,000	₹0	₹36,40,000	Mallika
7	₹12,00,000	₹0	₹36,40,000	Ikka
In this mission, the players were handcuffed together. They had to mutually decide which player they wanted to release. The released players then get an opportunity to meet Karan, who presented them with three options: Option 1: ₹3,00,000 for the prize pot.; Option 2: A shield.; Option 3: A Destiny Card.; Following the mission, Rida, Mallika, and Ikka chose the Shield, while Shalini chose the Destiny Card. In the subsequent Circle of Shaq, Shalini was given the opportunity to use her ‘Destiny Card’ to save the banished player, Shahneel. However, she chose not to use it.
8	₹14,00,000	₹2,00,000	₹38,40,000	Rida
8	₹14,00,000	₹2,00,000	₹38,40,000	Mallika
8	₹14,00,000	₹2,00,000	₹38,40,000	Rhea
The Traitors Krystle and Rida were given a secret mission to murder a player in plain sight by cursing them. They had to tear the chosen player’s image from a book and place it in a hidden drawer behind Boo’s portrait. The victim’s identity would be revealed during the following mission. Before the mission, all players except Ansh, Ikka, and Shalini, who were missing, received a ruby worth ₹2,00,000. On their way to the mission, they had the opportunity to earn a Shield by giving up their ruby.: Checkpoint 1: 3 rubies.; Result: Krystle, Prish and Rida gave up their rubies to give Rida the Shield.; Checkpoint 2: 2 rubies.; Result: Sahil and Mallika gave up their rubies to give Mallika the Shield.; Checkpoint 3: 1 ruby.; Result: Rhea used her ruby to earn the Shield.; Dalip was the only remaining player with a ruby upon arriving at the mission, so ₹2,00,000 was added to the prize pot. By using his ruby, he had the opportunity to guess which of Ansh, Ikka, and Shalini had been murdered. If he guessed correctly, the chosen player would be saved from the murder. He chose Ansh, but the correct answer was Ikka.
9	₹20,00,000	₹10,00,000	₹48,40,000	Shalini
In this mission, the players are seated around a round table. In each round, they are blindfolded while host Karan spins the table. A box is placed on the table, and whichever player the box lands near gets the opportunity to remove their blindfold and eliminate another player by shining a torch on them. Karan then takes the box to the eliminated player, who gets a chance to guess who eliminated them. If their guess is correct, ₹5 lakh is added to the prize pot and the player who made the elimination is eliminated from the game. If the guess is incorrect, the eliminated player is out. Before the mission began, Ansh walked out. Following the successive eliminations of Sahil, Dalip, and Rida; Krystle, Mallika, and Shalini remained. They were then presented with three options, which were placed inside the box: Option 1: A shield.; Option 2: A dagger.; Option 3: A Mask; that can be used in a subsequent night to unmask any player’s affiliation.; They mutually decided: Shalini took the Shield, Mallika took the Dagger, and Krystle took the Mask. ---Krystle used the Mask to invite Mallika to reveal her identity, which turned out to be an Innocent.
10	₹25,00,000	₹17,60,000	₹66,00,000	None
The players had to collect gold bars, each worth ₹80,000, from camels in a corral by taking them from the camels’ rugs, and then blast a statue of the Traitors using TNT within ten minutes. In the end, ₹17,60,000 was added to the prize pot from the mission.

== Reception ==
The season two received a mixed-to-positive response, with praise for its cast, production and Karan Johar’s hosting, while some reviews criticized the pacing and manufactured suspense. The season also generated significant discussion on social media. Variety reported that it became Prime Video’s No. 1 non-English title worldwide during its launch week.

== Episodes ==
The Traitors season 2 episodes
No. overall	No. in season	Title	Original release date
11	1	"Episode 1"	13 August 2026
12	2	"Episode 2"	13 August 2026
13	3	"Episode 3"	13 August 2026
14	4	"Episode 4"	20 August 2026
15	5	"Episode 5"	20 August 2026
16	6	"Episode 6"	20 August 2026
17	7	"Episode 7"	27 August 2026
18	8	"Episode 8"	27 August 2026
19	9	"Episode 9"	27 August 2026
20	10	"Episode 10"	3 September 2026
21	11	"Reunion"	9 September 2026
