= Nikita Luther =

Indian poker player (born 1991)

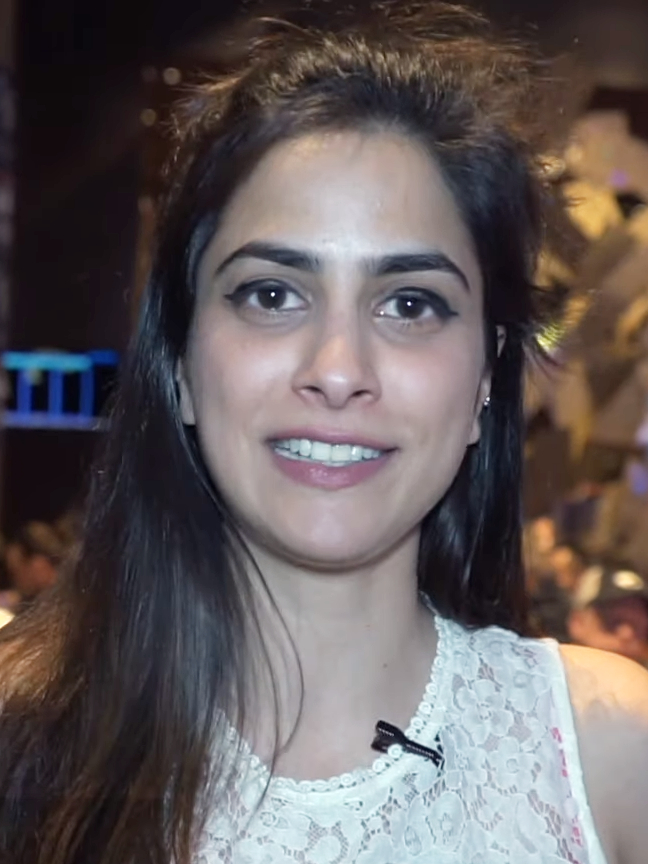
- Luther in 2019
- Born: 17 January 1991 (age 35); New Delhi, India

World Series of Poker
- Bracelet: 1
- Final table: 1
- Money finishes: 14
- Highest WSOP Main Event finish: 96th, 2023

World Poker Tour
- Title: None
- Final tables: 3
- Money finishes: 4

European Poker Tour
- Title: None
- Final table: None
- Money finishes: 4

Nikita Luther (born 20 January 1991) is an Indian professional poker player based in Greater Kailash, New Delhi.

Nikita is the first Indian female poker player who won a bracelet in the 2018 World Series of Poker.

Currently, she is mentoring her insights at the ‘Super Bowl’ of poker championship in India and COO of Poker Sports League.

== Early life ==
Nikita Luther was born into a military family and raised in Delhi. She completed her schooling from "Sanskriti School", Delhi followed by a bachelor’s degree from Delhi University.

== Career ==
Nikita started playing poker on an American based poker platform called Zynga, until finally when she got a chance to play poker at a friend’s birthday in 2015 for real money. After realizing her penchant for poker & she started playing poker full time.

She pursued poker because her passion for the game is deeply rooted in her love for mathematics and its logical structure, which she compares to solving intricate math puzzles. She was drawn to the game after recognizing that it wasn’t about luck but a skill-based sport requiring strategic thinking, probability analysis, and psychological insight, qualities she naturally excelled in through her mathematical acumen.

In 2015, Nikita won her first title which was the ladies' event at the Indian Poker Championship in Goa. She has also made it to the final table of three other big tournaments, finishing second, fourth, and eighth.

Luther along with another poker player Raghav Bansal won Macau Poker Cup team event in February 2017. In June 2017, she won 5th place in the Aria Poker Classic Main Event, which awarded her $65,000.

In 2018, at the age of 27, Nikita won her career's first bracelet at 2018 World Series of Poker (WSOP), Las Vegas, Nevada with her teammate, German Italian poker player Giuseppe Pantaleo. This year, participants from 88 nations entered over 123,000 entries across multiple tournaments. Only one girl, Nikita Luther, has won the WSOP gold championship.

Later that year, she was featured on the cover of Gutshot Magazine, a leading poker news and content platform based in India. The cover titled 'Bracelet Buddies' was one signifying the only two Indians to win a WSOP gold bracelet in Las Vegas - Aditya Sushant and Luther herself.

Subsequently she made x final tables throughout her career which included a 2nd place out of 1932 entries in Aria Poker Classic, Las Vegas again posting India’s first 6 figure score in 2019.

Nikita is the brand ambassador of Natural8 India, Asia's online poker room.

Nikita Luther can also be seen in Karan Johar's The Traitors India, an Amazon Prime web series. Where she won the show with Urfi Javed.

== Awards ==
- 2018 WSOP $1,000 NLH Tag Team Event in Las Vegas
- 2015 India Poker Championship Ladies Event Title
- 2017 Poker Stars Trophy, Macau Poker Cup

== World Series of Poker bracelets ==
Year	Tournament	Prize (US$)
2018	$1,000 Tag Team No Limit Hold'em	$175,805
