= The Traitors (Telugu TV series) season 1 =

The Traitors
- Season 1
- Presented by: Teja Sajja
- No. of contestants: 20
- Winners: Shravya Varma; Sweekar Agasthi
- Location: Lalitha Mahal, Mysuru, India
- No. of episodes: 10

Release
- Original network: Prime Video
- Original release: 15 October – 5 November 2026

The first season of The Traitors premiered on Prime Video on 15 October 2026, with Teja Sajja as the host. The season concluded on 5 November 2026, with Shravya Varma and Sweekar Agasthi winning the inaugural season as Traitors.

== Format ==
A group of contestants arrive at the Mahal in Mysuru, Karnataka with hopes of winning a large cash prize of ₹1 crore that is built up through missions. The players are referred to as the "Innocents", but among them are the "Traitors" — a group of contestants secretly selected by the host. If the Innocents eliminate all the Traitors, they will share the prize fund. However, if any Traitors manage to make it to the end, eliminating the Innocents, they win the entire prize money.

The contestants participate in missions to build up their cash prize. In some missions, any contestant may also win a ‘shield’ that grants them immunity from the subsequent murder.

On most nights, The Traitors meet in a secret tower to decide on an Innocent contestant to ‘murder,’ who is then immediately eliminated from the game. The remaining Innocents are unaware of who has been eliminated until the following morning, when that person fails to appear at the breakfast table in the castle.

At the end of each day, the players gather at the ‘Ring of Doubt,’ where they discuss whom to vote out before individually casting their votes. Players vote privately, then reveal their choices one by one, often giving a brief rationale for their decision. The player who receives the most votes is banished from the game and reveals their affiliation. If during the game the number of ‘Traitors’ drops to two, they are given the choice to recruit an Innocent to join them instead of murdering.

After the final Ring of Doubt, the remaining players participate in the End Game. The group are given an opportunity to end the game by unanimous vote. Any vote to continue will lead to another immediate banishment vote. When a unanimous decision is reached to end the game — or when there are only two players left — the remaining players reveal their affiliation. If all remaining players are Innocents, then the prize money is divided evenly among them. However, if any Traitors remain, they win the entire prize money.

== Production ==
The first official trailer was posted on Prime Video's social media on 29 September 2026, with the premiere date of 15 October 2026.

== Contestants ==
20 contestants competed on the first season of The Traitors Telugu.

Chinmayi was chosen by the rest of the players as the most trustworthy and she chose Dhanunjaya as the least trustworthy and he was eliminated from the game on arrival at the Mahal. However, Dhanunjaya re-entered to the show in Episode 3.

Contestant	Age	Notability	Affiliation	Finish
Chinmayi Sripada	42	Singer Voice actor	Innocent	Murdered (Episode 2)
Gaurav Sunil	27	Content creator	Innocent	Banished (Episode 2)
Nikhil Vijayendra Simha	30	Digital content creator	Innocent	Murdered (Episode 3)
Vidyullekha Raman	34	Actor	Traitor	Banished (Episode 3)
Vishnu Oi	36	Actor	Innocent	Banished (Episode 4)
Vishnu Oi	36	Actor	Traitor (from ep. 4)	Banished (Episode 4)
Sai Ronak	34	Actor	Innocent	Murdered (Episode 5)
Phalguni Bangera	30	Choreographer	Innocent	Banished (Episode 5)
Rahat Achanta	33	Entrepreneur	Traitor	Banished (Episode 6)
SivaSai Vardhan Jaladhanki	43	Writer Director	Innocent	Murdered (Episode 7)
Shreedevi Chowdary	54	Celebrity Socialite	Innocent	Banished (Episode 7)
Pragathi Mahavadi	50	Actress Athlete	Innocent	Murdered (Episode 8)
Ashika Gopal Padukone	29	TV personality	Traitor	Banished (Episode 8)
Mouneesha Chowdary	32	Digital creator	Innocent	Murdered (Episode 9)
Harsha Vardhan	51	Actor Writer	Innocent	Banished (Episode 9)
Pranav Chaganty "AbhinavaKavi"	33	Rapper	Innocent	Murdered (Episode 10)
Puppala Dhanunjaya "Dhanu Dino"	24	Gamer	Innocent	Banished (Episode 10)
Varsha D'Souza	23	Influencer	Innocent	Banished (Episode 10)
Meghanath Reddy	39	Doctor	Innocent	Banished (Episode 10)
Sweekar Agasthi	40	Music director Singer	Innocent	Winner (Episode 10)
Sweekar Agasthi	40	Music director Singer	Traitor (from ep. 7)	Winner (Episode 10)
Shravya Varma	33	Costume designer Celebrity stylist	Innocent	Winner (Episode 10)
Shravya Varma	33	Costume designer Celebrity stylist	Traitor (from ep. 9)	Winner (Episode 10)

== Elimination History ==
Key

The contestant was an Innocent.
The contestant was a Traitor.
The contestant was murdered by the Traitors.
The contestant was banished at the round table.
The contestant was immune for the banishment and subsequent murder.

Episode	1	2	3	4	5	6	7		8	9		10
Traitor's decision	Not; Introduced	Chinmayi	Nikhil	Vishnu	Ronak	Dhanunjaya; ~~Mouneesha~~; Shravya; Vardhan	Vardhan	Sweekar	Pragathi	Shravya	Mouneesha	Pranav
Traitor's decision	Not; Introduced	Murder		Recruit (offer accepted by Vishnu)	Murder	On; Hit list (Note: Instead of selecting one Innocent to be murdered, the Traitors, Ashika and Rahat, were asked to put four players on hit list. The next night, only those four players would be up to be murdered. However, Mouneesha was saved through a mission.)	Murder	Blackmail (offer accepted by Sweekar) (Note: Following Rahat’s banishment, Ashika was offered the chance to meet an Innocent face-to-face and blackmail them into becoming a Traitor or be Murdered.)	Murder (In plain sight) (Note: Traitors, Ashika and Sweekar, were tasked to murder someone in plain sight, by taking an Innocent’s photo from the chest box placed on the lounge area window near the main hall and then placing their victim’s photograph in the garden’s birdbath fountain. Host Teja told the players that the victim’s identity would be revealed at the following morning’s breakfast table.)	Blackmail (offer accepted by Shravya) (Note: Following Ashika’s banishment, Sweekar was offered the chance to meet an Innocent face-to-face and blackmail them into becoming a Traitor or be Murdered.)	Murder	
Shield	Not; Introduced	Harsha; Pragathi; Shravya; Vardhan	Mouneesha; Phalguni; Pragathi; Pranav; Ronak; Shravya; Vardhan; Sweekar	None (Note: Harsha and Rahat acquired shield for themselves. However, the players failed completing the mission and shield acquired were forfeited.)	None		Meghanath		None	Meghanath		None
Banishment	Not; Introduced	Gaurav	Vidyullekha	Vishnu	Phalguni	Rahat	Shreedevi		Ashika	Harsha		Dhanunjaya
Vote	Not; Introduced	10-7-1	14-2	15-1	10-3-1	9-4	6-5-1		9-1	6-2		4-1
Shravya	No; Vote	Vidyullekha	Vidyullekha	Vishnu	Harsha	Rahat	Harsha		Ashika	Harsha		Dhanunjaya
Sweekar	No; Vote	Ashika	Vidyullekha	Vishnu	Phalguni	Rahat	Harsha		Ashika	Harsha; Harsha†		Dhanunjaya
Meghanath	No; Vote	Gaurav	Vidyullekha	Vishnu	Phalguni	Rahat	Shreedevi		Ashika	Varsha		Dhanunjaya
Varsha	No; Vote	Gaurav	Vidyullekha	Vishnu	Phalguni	Dhanunjaya	Shreedevi		Ashika	Harsha		Dhanunjaya
Dhanunjaya	No; Vote	Exiled (Note: Chinmayi was chosen by the rest of the players as the most trustworthy and she chose Dhanunjaya as the least trustworthy and he was eliminated from the game on arrival at the Mahal.) (Episode 1)	Not eligible	Vishnu	Phalguni	Rahat	Shreedevi		Ashika	Harsha		Sweekar
Pranav	No; Vote	Gaurav	Vidyullekha	Vishnu	Dhanunjaya	Dhanunjaya	Harsha		Ashika	Harsha		Murdered (Episode 10)
Harsha	No; Vote	Gaurav	Vidyullekha	Vishnu	Phalguni	Dhanunjaya	Shreedevi		Ashika; Ashika†	Varsha		Banished (Episode 9)
Mouneesha	No; Vote	Gaurav	Vidyullekha	Vishnu	Phalguni	Rahat	Dhanunjaya		Ashika	Murdered (Episode 9)		
Ashika	No; Vote	Vidyullekha	Vidyullekha	Vishnu	Phalguni	Rahat	Harsha		Mouneesha	Banished (Episode 8)		
Pragathi	No; Vote	Vidyullekha	Vidyullekha	Vishnu	Phalguni	Rahat	Shreedevi; Shreedevi†		Murdered (Episode 8)			
Shreedevi	No; Vote	Gaurav	Ashika	Vishnu	Phalguni	Rahat	Harsha		Banished (Episode 7)			
Vardhan	No; Vote	Vidyullekha	Vidyullekha	Vishnu	Phalguni	Rahat	Murdered (Episode 7)					
Rahat	No; Vote	Gaurav	Vidyullekha	Vishnu	Dhanunjaya	Dhanunjaya	Banished (Episode 6)					
Phalguni	No; Vote	Gaurav	Vidyullekha	Vishnu	Dhanunjaya	Banished (Episode 5)						
Ronak	No; Vote	Vidyullekha	Vidyullekha	Vishnu	Murdered (Episode 5)							
Vishnu	No; Vote	Gaurav	Vidyullekha	Varsha	Banished (Episode 4)							
Vidyullekha	No; Vote	Gaurav	Ashika	Banished (Episode 3)								
Nikhil	No; Vote	Vidyullekha	Murdered (Episode 3)									
Gaurav	No; Vote	Vidyullekha	Banished (Episode 2)									
Chinmayi	Dhanunjaya	Murdered (Episode 2)										

=== End game ===
Decision	Banish	Varsha	Banish	Meghanath	Game; Ended
Vote	4–0	3–1	2–1	2–1	Game; Ended
Shravya	Doubt	Varsha	Trust	Meghanath	Winner
Sweekar	Doubt	Varsha	Trust	Meghanath	Winner
Meghanath	Doubt	Varsha	Doubt	Sweekar	Banished
Varsha	Doubt	Sweekar	Banished		
Dhanunjaya	Banished				

== Missions ==
Episode	Money available	Money earned	Total pot	Shield
1	₹15,00,000	₹13,53,000	₹13,53,000	Not Introduced
Players were tasked with finding the hidden vault keys while avoiding paintball shots. The vault team had to transfer gold bars to the ground team, who were responsible for delivering them to the podium within 20 minutes. Any player hit by a paintball was immediately eliminated from the task.
2	₹6,00,000	₹2,04,000	₹15,57,000	Harsha
2	₹6,00,000	₹2,04,000	₹15,57,000	Pragathi
2	₹6,00,000	₹2,04,000	₹15,57,000	Shravya
2	₹6,00,000	₹2,04,000	₹15,57,000	Vardhan
The players were divided into two groups and tasked with using the keys to unlock multiple lockers containing gold bars, shields and a jackpot gold bar. They had 20 minutes to collect the items. After the halfway point, the spears mounted on the walls began closing in on the players, and at the end of the allotted time, the walls closed completely, preventing access to the lockers.: Team Red: Gaurav, Harsha, Nikhil, Pragathi, Pranav, Ronak, Shravya, Sweekar, Vishnu; Team Green: Ashika, Meghanath, Mouneesha, Phalguni, Rahat, Shreedevi, Vardhan, Varsha, Vidyullekha Team Red collected the most gold bars and their amount was added to the prize pot.
3	₹8,00,000	₹8,00,000	₹23,57,000	Mouneesha
3	₹8,00,000	₹8,00,000	₹23,57,000	Phalguni
3	₹8,00,000	₹8,00,000	₹23,57,000	Pragathi
3	₹8,00,000	₹8,00,000	₹23,57,000	Pranav
3	₹8,00,000	₹8,00,000	₹23,57,000	Ronak
3	₹8,00,000	₹8,00,000	₹23,57,000	Shravya
3	₹8,00,000	₹8,00,000	₹23,57,000	Vardhan
3	₹8,00,000	₹8,00,000	₹23,57,000	Sweekar
The players were tasked with taking the barrel of huge shield pieces through the field. The path had pitspots to collect fuel for ring the fire. If they successfully reach the end and assemble the shield, the players on the shield would be safe from murder. The first pitstop forced them to leave two players behind; Harsha and Rahat were sacrificed. The second pitstop forced them to leave two players behind; Meghanath and Shreedevi were sacrificed. The third pitstop forced them to leave four players behind; Varsha and Vishnu were sacrificed. The fourth pitstop forced them to leave two players behind; Ashika and Vidyullekha were sacrificed. Mouneesha, Phalguni, Pragathi, Pranav, Ronak, Shravya, Vardhan and Sweekar won the shields. Dhanunjaya re-entered the game.
4	₹12,00,000	₹0	₹23,57,000	~~Harsha~~
4	₹12,00,000	₹0	₹23,57,000	~~Rahat~~
The players were tasked with finding five pieces of sandalwood and three watches hidden in a dark forest within 15 minutes. Players who found a watch could either cash it in to add money to the prize pot or exchange it for a shield. However, if they failed to find all five pieces of sandalwood, any money earned or shields acquired during the task would be forfeited.
5	₹28,00,000	₹0	₹23,57,000	None
The players in pairs and were tasked with moving a barrel across a course. Each pair had to decide whether to add the money earned to the prize pot or to a personal pot, with only one player from each pair allowed to claim the money. However, if four pairs failed to contribute to the prize pot, no money would be added to it. Players who chose to add money to their personal pots would retain their respective earnings. Ashika, Phalguni, Pranav and Shreedevi each took ₹4,00,000 for their personal pots.
6	₹8,00,000	₹8,00,000	₹31,57,000	None
Four players—Dhanunjaya, Mouneesha, Shravya and Vardhan—were suspended in chairs at a height. The remaining players had to fill a water tank to retrieve a saw, which they could use to cut the ropes and rescue one of the suspended players. Mouneesha was rescued and removed from the Hit List.
7	₹9,00,000	₹7,20,000	₹38,77,000	Meghanath
The players were taken to a picture museum, where they had to solve riddles and identify the corresponding pictures. The first player to answer each riddle correctly got to choose whether to add or swap a player's photograph for a Shield or a Dagger on the frame. At the end of the task, the players whose photographs remained on the frame received the respective advantages. Meghanath won the Shield Advantage, while Pragathi won the Dagger Advantage.
8	₹9,00,000	₹4,00,000	₹42,77,000	None
The players faced an enormous chessboard featuring their names and were challenged to think like Traitors. They had to answer a series of questions by positioning themselves on the name of the player they believed was the correct answer. For every answer that matched the responses given by the Traitors, ₹1,00,000 was added to the prize fund. For the final question, the Traitors chose one player to receive the Dagger Advantage. If the player answered correctly, an additional ₹3,00,000 was added to the prize fund. Harsha received the dagger.
9	₹10,00,000	₹0	₹42,77,000	Meghanath
Seven players were required to pair up into three pairs, leaving Dhanunjaya out of the first part of the mission. Each pair competed in a bluffing game, where one player had to bluff while the other had the opportunity to swap. The winners of each pair received an advantage: Meghanath won the Shield Advantage against Harsha, Sweekar won the Dagger Advantage against Pranav, and Shravya won the ₹4,00,000 Cash Advantage against Varsha. Shravya was given the choice of either keeping the ₹5,00,000 in her personal pot or doubling the amount and adding it to the winner's prize pot. She chose to keep the money in her personal pot. In the second part of the mission, the four players without an advantage had to choose a box, one of which contained the Swap Power. Pranav found the Swap Power and used it to take Shravya's ₹5,00,000 Cash Advantage for his personal pot.

== Reception ==
While early reviews praise the show's lavish production values and intense suspense, critics from outlets like India Today note that the initial episodes lean heavily into emotional drama and interpersonal conflict rather than the tactical deception central to the original international format. Host Teja Sajja’s hosting style were criticised by the viewers.

== Episodes ==
The Traitors season 1 episodes
No. overall	No. in season	Title	Original release date
1	1	"Episode 1"	15 October 2026
2	2	"Episode 2"	15 October 2026
3	3	"Episode 3"	15 October 2026
4	4	"Episode 4"	22 October 2026
5	5	"Episode 5"	22 October 2026
6	6	"Episode 6"	22 October 2026
7	7	"Episode 7"	29 October 2026
8	8	"Episode 8"	29 October 2026
9	9	"Episode 9"	29 October 2026
10	10	"Episode 10"	5 November 2026
