= Raj Kundra =

British businessman

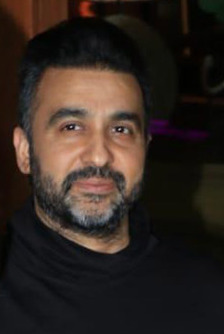
- Kundra in 2020
- Born: Ripu Sudan Kundra; 9 September 1975 (age 50); London, England
- Occupation: Businessman
- Spouses: Kavita Kundra (m. 2003; div. 2009); Shilpa Shetty (m. 2009)
- Children: 3
- Website: rajkundra.net

Raj Kundra is a British-Indian businessman and part time actor. He has faced legal scrutiny over allegations related to the production of adult content and involvement in sports betting.

He has been married to Shilpa Shetty, an Indian actress, since 2009.

== Early life ==
Raj Kundra was born in London, England to Indian expats. Kundra's parents were Punjabi Hindus from Ludhiana. Kundra grew up in a middle-class family. His father, Bal Krishan Kundra worked as a bus conductor in London before running a small business. His mother, Usha Rani Kundra worked as a shop assistant.

== Career ==
At the age of 18, Kundra moved to Dubai and later Nepal, where he started a business selling pashmina shawls to fashion retailers in Britain and made his first couple of millions. In 2007, he moved to Dubai and set up Essential General Trading LLC, a company dealing in precious metals, construction, mining and renewable energy projects. He was also at that time involved in the financing and production of Bollywood films.

He has also been involved in financing and distributing pornographic films, for which he was arrested in 2021.

His businesses included Satyug Gold, Super Fight League, and more recently, Bastian Hospitality - a restaurant chain in Mumbai.

In 2015, Kundra was among the promoters of online and television broadcast platform Best Deal TV, an Indian television home shopping channel capitalising on celebrity endorsements. His co-promoter was Bollywood actor Akshay Kumar.

Under the Indian government's Startup India initiative, Kundra is set to launch India's first live streaming social media app, Jaldi Live Stream App which will allow professional as well as amateur streamers to live stream their content. In June 2025, he participated as contestant in the Prime Video's The Traitors. He was eliminated on Day 2 and placed 19th.

== Filmography ==
=== Television ===
Year	Title	Role	Notes	Ref.
2025	The Traitors	Contestant	19th place	

=== Film ===
Year	Title	Role	Ref.
2023	UT69	Himself	
2025	Mehar	Karamjit Singh	

== Indian Premier League ==
In 2009, Kundra and Shetty invested in the Indian Premier League cricket team Rajasthan Royals using an offshore company based in Mauritius. The legality of the investment was questioned by departments of the Government of India.

In June 2013, Kundra was questioned by Delhi Police with regard to the 2013 Indian Premier League spot-fixing case, which had involved the arrest of some Rajasthan Royals players, further Delhi police have given a clean chit to Kundra in reply on right to information (RTI). In July 2015 a panel appointed by the Supreme Court of India imposed a life ban from the cricket-related activity on him. Further, Kundra denied the involvement and appeal to the Supreme Court of India.

Umesh Goenka, a business partner of Raj Kundra claimed in a court that he was forced to implicate Kundra in betting by Delhi Police and to save himself from physical torture and from being charged under Maharashtra Control of Organised Crime Act.

== Super Fight League ==
Kundra and Bollywood star Sanjay Dutt launched India's first professional mixed martial arts fighting league, the Super Fight League, on 16 January 2012.

== Awards and honours ==
Kundra was awarded the Champions of Change Award in 2019, for his involvement with Swachh Bharat Mission. The award was conferred by former President of India Pranab Mukherjee at Vigyan Bhavan New Delhi on 20 January 2020.

== Controversy ==
Kundra was arrested in July 2021 on charges of producing pornographic content. He was booked under the Indian Penal Code (IPC), the Information Technology Act, 2000 and the Indecent Representation of Women (Prevention) Act. He was granted bail in September 2021 by a metropolitan magistrate's court. On 3 November 2023, a film on the controversy titled UT 69 was released. Kundra himself played the lead role and presented experiences of his days in prison.

The Enforcement Directorate attached his properties worth 97 crores in Bitcoin investment fraud case which was alleged to be a ponzi scheme.

In August 2025, Mumbai police have filed a case against Shilpa Shetty and her husband Raj Kundra for reportedly stealing ₹60.4 crore from a businessman in a loan-cum-investment deal in their old company (now defunct), Best Deal TV Private Limited.

== Personal life ==
Kundra has been married twice, first to Kavita Kundra, with whom he has a daughter. The couple later divorced. On 22 November 2009, Kundra married Bollywood actress Shilpa Shetty. Kundra and Shetty have a son, born in 2012, and a daughter, born through surrogacy in 2020.

Kundra is involved with his wife's charitable organisation, the Shilpa Shetty Foundation.

He published a crime thriller, How Not to Make Money, in 2013.
