= Urfi Javed =

Internet personality (born 1995)

Uorfi Javed
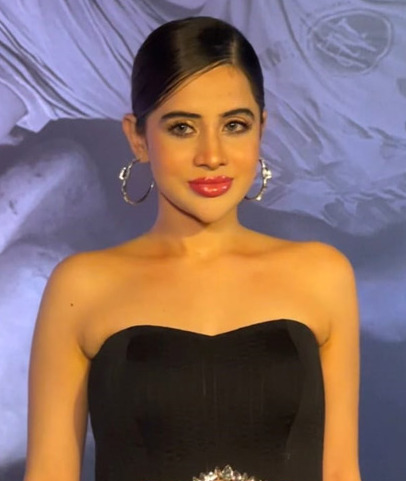
- Urfi in 2023
- Born: Urfi; 15 October 1995 (age 31); Lucknow, Uttar Pradesh, India
- Other name: Uorfi Javed
- Education: Amity University, Noida
- Occupations: Internet personality; Social Media Influencer; Television actress
- Years active: 2016–present
- Known for: Bigg Boss OTT 1; The Traitors India

Uorfi Javed (born Urfi; 15 October 1995), better known as Urfi Javed, is an Indian model, media personality and television actress who primarily works in hindi television. Known for her unique fashion sense and social media presence, Javed has also been described as famous for being famous. She also participated in reality shows Bigg Boss OTT 1 and The Traitors India becoming winner in the latter. In 2024, she appeared in the film Love Sex Aur Dhokha 2.

== Early and personal life ==
Javed was born in Lucknow, Uttar Pradesh on 15 October 1995. She did her schooling from City Montessori School, Lucknow. She graduated from Amity University, Lucknow in mass communication. She was born to Ifru Javed and Zakiya Sultana, and has three sisters, Urusa, Asfi, and Dolly Javed, and a brother named Sameer Aslam. She had a difficult childhood, as her father verbally and physically mistreated her mother and siblings. Javed began dating her Meri Durga co-actor Paras Kalnawat in 2017. The couple broke up in 2018.

Though raised in a conservative Muslim family, Javed has stated that "I don't believe in Islam and I don't follow any religion". In 2021, Javed stated that she would not marry a Muslim man. Amid a debate over changing the name of her hometown of Lucknow in 2023, Javed tweeted "I want to stay in a democratic rashtra! Neither Hindu rashtra nor Muslim rashtra."

In 2022, she announced her change of name to Uorfi on social media, and suggested that she be referred to by her new name. Although pronounced the same, the change in spelling was done on advice of a numerologist.

== Career ==
In 2016, Javed appeared in Sony TV's Bade Bhaiyya Ki Dulhania as Avni Pant. From 2016 to 2017, she played Chhaya in Star Plus's Chandra Nandini. She was also cast for an episodic role in Star Plus's Naamkaran. Then, she portrayed Aarti in Star Plus's Meri Durga.

In 2018, she played Kamini Joshi in SAB TV's Saat Phero Ki Hera Pherie, Bella Kapoor in Colors TV's Bepannaah, Piyali in Star Bharat's Jiji Maa and Nandini in &TV's Daayan.

In 2020, she joined Yeh Rishta Kya Kehlata Hai as Shivani Bhatia. She later played Tanisha Chakraborty in Kasautii Zindagii Kay.

In 2021, she participated in Voot's reality show Bigg Boss OTT where she finished at 13th place. According to Vice, Javed "shot to fame in India" following her appearances on Bigg Boss OTT, where she achieved popular recognition for her unique fashion sense.

In 2022, she was seen in a music video with Indo-Canadian singer Kunwarr. In December 2022, she participated in MTV India's reality show MTV Splitsvilla X4 as a guest contestant and mischief maker.

In 2023, it was reported by various media outlets that Urfi was detained in Dubai, United Arab Emirates for filming while wearing provocative clothing in a public area, which is against the law in the UAE. However, Javed clarified that the police had come on the set because of a logistics issue, not for reasons related to her choice of attire. The shoot resumed the next day.

Javed made her film debut with Dibakar Banerjee's Love Sex Aur Dhokha 2 in 2024. In the same year, she also appeared on India's Got Latent, as a guest judge. In June 2025, she participated in Prime Video's The Traitors India, where she emerged as the winner with Nikitha Luther.

== Public image ==
Javed gained public recognition for her fashion sense during her time as a contestant on Bigg Boss OTT, where she wore a dress made out of a garbage bag. Javed has made and wore a number of pieces described as 'bizarre dresses' by Lifestyle Asia, including dresses made out of watches, yellow flowers, chains, and pins. In 2023, she was featured in Forbes, where she stated that "consistency is the key to stay in fashion, in conversations, and in business". In 2025, Javed was placed in the "35 most influential young Indians" list by GQ.

In December 2022, Javed received the distinction of becoming one of the most searched Asians on Google, ahead of Bollywood celebrities including Janhvi Kapoor, Sara Ali Khan, and Disha Patani. As of January 2023, Javed has over four million Instagram followers, and in September 2024 Uorfi passed five million followers. On X, she has over 209k followers.

During her second appearance on India's Got Latent, some of the contestants endorsed derogatory remarks on Javed, which included calling her a 'b*tch', comparing her with adult actress Mia Khalifa after having a verbal altercation with her over him faking a disability, which eventually led to her walking off the show. The show's main judge, Samay Raina didn't intervene and Balraj Ghai was called in to replace her for the last two performances.

In a tweet, Bharatiya Janata Party (BJP) politician Chitra Wagh accused Javed of "indulging in nudity publicly on the streets of Mumbai". Following Wagh's complaint, the Mumbai Police called Javed in for inquiry at a police station in Amboli. Javed filed a complaint against Wagh, alleging that politician was engaging in "threatening and criminal intimidation to harm the actor in the public domain."

== Filmography ==
=== Film ===
Year	Title	Role	Notes	Ref.
2024	Love Sex Aur Dhokha 2	Chikni Choopdi		
2026	Vibe	Dr. Chanchal		

=== Television ===
Year	Title	Role	Notes	Ref.
2016	Bade Bhaiyya Ki Dulhania	Avni Pant		
2016–2017	Chandra Nandini	Princess Chhaya		
2017	Meri Durga	Aarti Singhania		
2017	Bepannaah	Bella Kapoor		
2018	Saat Phero Ki Hera Pherie	Kamini Joshi		
2018	Jiji Maa	Shravani Purohit/Piyali Sehgal		
2018–2019	Daayan	Nandini		
2020	Yeh Rishta Kya Kehlata Hai	Advocate Shivani Bhatia		
2020	Kasautii Zindagii Kay 2	Tanisha Chakraborty		
2020	Aye Mere Humsafar	Payal Sharma		
2021	Bigg Boss OTT 1	Contestant	13th place	
2021	Puncch Beat	Meera	Season 2	
2022–present	MTV Splitsvilla	Mischief Maker	Season 14–16	
2023	Playground	Herself / Mentor		
2024	Dance Plus Pro	Herself		
2024	Madness Machayenge – India Ko Hasayenge	Guest		
2024	Follow Kar Lo Yaar	Herself		
2024-2025	India's Got Latent	Guest Judge		
2025	Engaged: Roka Ya Dhoka	Herself / Host		
2025	The Traitors India	Contestant	Winner	
