= Marc Pos =

Dutch creative entrepreneur, writer, director and producer

Marc Pos ('s-Hertogenbosch, 24 October 1968) is a Dutch creative entrepreneur, writer, director, producer and maker of television, video, theatre, events and advertising. His work, most notably, was rewarded with an Emmy for Best Reality Series for The Traitors, in 2024. In that same year, host Alan Cummings was rewarded Best Reality or Competition Program Host. Pos also three times won the New York Festivals TV & Film Awards, for The Secret of a Master Painter (2016), a documentary about Lang Lang (2017), and The New Stradivarius (2018). De Lama's won the Dutch Emmy's in 2006 (the Gouden Televizier-Ring). In 2021 Pos was awarded the Dutch Directors Guild Award for his contributions as director of the opening, intermezzos and acts during the Eurovision Song Contest 2021. With The Traitors, Pos won the C21 Best World Format in 2021, the Rose d'Or in 2022, a Banff Rockie Award for Competition Series & Game Shows in 2023, and in 2025, the National Television Awards 2023, an Emmy, and a BAFTA for Reality & Constructed Factual in 2023.

== Producer ==
Pos founded POSVIDEO in 2015. Here he develops owned formats such as The Secret of a Master Painter (with the special The Secret of the Night Watch), Historical Evidence and the investigative journalist program Worth of the Earth. Psychological entertainment program The Traitors, based on his original 2014 idea, was sold in over 20 countries, among which the BBC's The Traitors and NBC's The Traitors. Since November 2020, POSVIDEO works in a partnership with All3Media production house IDTV, where he became creative director in 2021. In 2023, Pos established a "creative gallery" under the name marcpos.com where new ideas are developed.
