= 2025 Kerteminde municipal election =

Municipal election in Denmark

← 2021	18 November 2025	2029 →

All 25 seats to the Kerteminde municipal council 13 seats needed for a majority
- Turnout: 14,648 (74.7%) ▲2.0%
	First party	Second party	Third party
	C	A	I
Party	Conservatives	Social Democrats	Liberal Alliance
Last election	9 seats, 33.3%	10 seats, 36.6%	Did not stand
Seats won	8	5	3
Seat change	▼1	▼5	▲3
Popular vote	4,448	2,926	1,620
Percentage	30.9%	20.3%	11.2%
Swing	▼2.4%	▼16.2%	New
	Fourth party	Fifth party	Sixth party
	E	F	Ø
Party	Hverdagens Stemme	Green Left	Red-Green Alliance
Last election	Did not stand	1 seat, 5.5%	1 seat, 4.3%
Seats won	3	2	1
Seat change	▲3	▲1	0
Popular vote	1,577	1,132	664
Percentage	11.0%	7.9%	4.6%
Swing	New	▲2.4%	▲0.3%
	Seventh party	Eighth party	Ninth party
	V	O	B
Party	Venstre	Danish People's Party	Social Liberals
Last election	2 seats, 7.0%	1 seat, 4.6%	0 seats, 2.8%
Seats won	1	1	1
Seat change	▼1	0	▲1
Popular vote	654	602	375
Percentage	4.5%	4.2%	2.6%
Swing	▼2.5%	▼0.4%	▼0.1%
Mayor before election
Kasper Ejsing Olesen
Social Democrats
Mayor after election
Michael Nielsen
Conservatives

The 2025 Kerteminde Municipal election was held on November 18, 2025, to elect the 25 members to sit in the regional council for the Kerteminde Municipal council, in the period of 2026 to 2029. Michael Nielsen from the Conservatives, would win the mayoral position.

== Background ==
Following the 2021 election, Kasper Ejsing Olesen from Social Democrats became mayor for his second term. He would run for re-election.

== Electoral system ==
For elections to Danish municipalities, a number varying from 9 to 31 are chosen to be elected to the municipal council. The seats are then allocated using the D'Hondt method and a closed list proportional representation. Kerteminde Municipality had 25 seats in 2025.

== Electoral alliances ==
=== Electoral Alliance 1 ===
Party		Political alignment
A	Social Democrats	Centre-left
F	Green Left	Centre-left to Left-wing
Ø	Red-Green Alliance	Left-wing to Far-Left

=== Electoral Alliance 2 ===
Party		Political alignment
B	Social Liberals	Centre to Centre-left
M	Moderates	Centre to Centre-right
V	Venstre	Centre-right

=== Electoral Alliance 3 ===
Party		Political alignment
C	Conservatives	Centre-right
E	Hverdagens Stemme	Local politics
I	Liberal Alliance	Centre-right to Right-wing
Æ	Denmark Democrats	Right-wing to Far-right

== Results by polling station ==
Division	A	B	C	E	F	I	M	O	V	Æ	Ø
Division	%	%	%	%	%	%	%	%	%	%	%
Hindsholm	17.4	5.1	21.2	10.8	9.8	11.9	0.2	3.3	9.5	2.4	8.3
Kerteminde Idrætscenter	20.6	3.5	31.3	9.1	7.3	12.8	0.4	3.8	5.4	1.2	4.5
Nymarken	17.9	2.2	23.8	8.7	7.6	18.8	0.2	4.8	6.5	4.1	5.5
Marslev	16.1	1.3	31.0	23.3	5.2	6.1	1.1	4.3	4.0	3.5	4.0
Langeskov	20.8	1.1	52.7	6.2	3.7	5.1	0.3	3.0	2.4	2.5	2.3
Munkebo	23.3	2.4	17.2	14.3	12.8	13.1	0.8	5.8	2.8	2.2	5.3

== Results ==
Party		Votes	%	+/-	Seats	+/-
Kerteminde Municipality
C	Conservatives	4,448	30.89	-2.37	8	-1
A	Social Democrats	2,926	20.32	-16.25	5	-5
I	Liberal Alliance	1,620	11.25	New	3	New
E	Hverdagens Stemme	1,577	10.95	New	3	New
F	Green Left	1,132	7.86	+2.36	2	+1
Ø	Red-Green Alliance	664	4.61	+0.32	1	0
V	Venstre	654	4.54	-2.45	1	-1
O	Danish People's Party	602	4.18	-0.42	1	0
B	Social Liberals	375	2.60	-0.15	1	+1
Æ	Denmark Democrats	329	2.28	New	0	New
M	Moderates	74	0.51	New	0	New
Total		14,401	100	N/A	25	N/A
Invalid votes		41	0.21	-0.02		
Blank votes		206	1.05	+0.21		
Turnout		14,648	74.69	+2.05		
Source: valg.dk

== Opinion polls ==
Polling firm	Fieldwork date	Sample size	A	C	V	F	O	Ø	B	E	I	M	Æ	Others	Lead
Epinion	4 Sep - 13 Oct 2025	525	27.3	24.5	6.8	10.8	4.6	4.0	1.8	–	9.3	1.0	5.9	4.0	2.8
2024 european parliament election	9 Jun 2024		21.8	10.1	14.0	16.2	8.1	4.3	4.2	–	5.5	5.8	8.6	–	5.6
2022 general election	1 Nov 2022		37.4	6.8	9.9	6.6	2.8	3.3	1.8	–	5.4	9.3	9.2	–	27.5
2021 regional election	16 Nov 2021		28.5	20.1	25.8	6.4	4.1	4.6	2.9	–	0.7	–	–	–	2.7
2021 municipal election	16 Nov 2021		36.6 (10)	33.3 (9)	7.0 (2)	5.5 (1)	4.6 (1)	4.3 (1)	2.8 (0)	–	–	–	–	–	3.3
