= List of shipwrecks in May 1844 =

The list of shipwrecks in May 1844 includes ships sunk, foundered, wrecked, grounded, or otherwise lost during May 1844.

== 1 May ==
List of shipwrecks: 1 May 1844
Ship	State	Description
Amaranth	(United Kingdom of Great Britain and Ireland) British North America	The schooner was driven ashore by ice near McNairn's Cove, Nova Scotia.
Baltimore	United States	The ship was driven ashore at Memel, Prussia. She was on a voyage from Memel to London, United Kingdom. She was refloated on 6 May and resumed her voyage.
Ellen	United Kingdom	The ship was abandoned in the Atlantic Ocean. Her crew were rescued by Bytown (United Kingdom). Ellen was on a voyage from Cádiz, Spain to Halifax, Nova Scotia, British North America.
Koningen	Prussia	The ship ran aground at Memel. She was on a voyage from Memel to Bristol, Gloucestershire, United Kingdom. She was refloated.
Vesper	United Kingdom	The ship struck the Woolpack Rock and was consequently beached at St. Mary's, Isles of Scilly. She was later refloated and taken in to St. Mary's.

== 2 May ==
List of shipwrecks: 2 May 1844
Ship	State	Description
Joseph Howe	United Kingdom	The ship was sunk by ice in the Gut of Canso. She was on a voyage from Miramichi, New Brunswick, British North America to Bathurst, Gambia Colony and Protectorate.
Northumberland	(United Kingdom of Great Britain and Ireland) New South Wales	The cutter was wrecked at the mouth of the Manning River. Her crew were rescued.

== 3 May ==
List of shipwrecks: 3 May 1844
Ship	State	Description
Vivacious	United Kingdom	The ship ran aground on The Shingles, off the Isle of Wight. She was on a voyage from Emsworth, Hampshire to Newport, Isle of Wight. She was refloated and resumed her voyage.

== 4 May ==
List of shipwrecks: 4 May 1844
Ship	State	Description
Devon	United Kingdom	The ship caught fire at Topsham, Devon and was scuttled.
Hero	United Kingdom	The ship sank off Whitstable, Kent. She was on a voyage from London to Whitstable. She was refloated the next day and taken in to Whitstable.
Severn	United Kingdom	The steamship as driven into a bridge and sank in the River Usk at Newport, Monmouthshire. All on board were rescued. She was on a voyage from Newport to Bristol, Gloucestershire. She was refloated on 14 May and taken into dock for repair.

== 5 May ==
List of shipwrecks: 5 May 1844
Ship	State	Description
Dolphin	Kingdom of Hanover	The ship foundered off Arendal, Norway. Her crew were rescued. She was on a voyage from Køge, Denmark to Antwerp, Belgium.

== 6 May ==
List of shipwrecks: 6 May 1844
Ship	State	Description
Gordon	United Kingdom	The ship ran aground on the Wilsverden Bank, in the Scheldt and was severely damaged. She was on a voyage from Newcastle upon Tyne, Northumberland to Antwerp, Belgium.
Patrick Webster	United Kingdom	The ship was driven ashore near Halifax, Nova Scotia, British North America.

== 7 May ==
List of shipwrecks: 7 May 1844
Ship	State	Description
Charlotte Elizabeth	Hamburg	The ship struck ice and sank off Læsø, Denmark. Her crew were rescued She was on a voyage from Hamburg to Saint Petersburg, Russia.
Southampton	United Kingdom	The ship was sunk by ice in the Gut of Canso. She was on a voyage from Puerto Rico to Quebec City, Province of Canada, British North America.
Three Sisters	United Kingdom	The ship ran aground and sank at Newport, Monmouthshire. She was refloated on 16 May and taken in to Newport in a severely damaged condition.

== 8 May ==
List of shipwrecks: 8 May 1844
Ship	State	Description
Gordon	United Kingdom	The schooner ran aground in the Scheldt. She was on a voyage from Newcastle upon Tyne, Northumberland to Antwerp, Belgium. She was refloated the next day and taken in to Antwerp.
Johanna	Netherlands	The ship ran aground on a reef off Coney Island, Singapore. She was on a voyage from Samarang, Netherlands East Indies to Singapore. She was refloated on 12 May.
Mary Ann	(United Kingdom of Great Britain and Ireland) Jersey	The ship struck a sunken rock off "Grand River Cape", British North America and was consequently run ashore and wrecked. She was on a voyage from Jersey to Arichat, Nova Scotia, British North America.

== 9 May ==
List of shipwrecks: 9 May 1844
Ship	State	Description
Brisk	United Kingdom	The ship was driven ashore at Duncannon, County Wexford. She was on a voyage from Waterford to Lancaster, Lancashire. She was refloated.
Charles	United Kingdom	The ship struck the Callich Stone and was beached on Skye, Outer Hebrides. She was on a voyage from Liverpool, Lancashire to Lerwick, Shetland Isles.
Colebrook	United Kingdom	The ship was sunk by ice off Scatterie Island, Nova Scotia, British North America. Her crew were rescued. She was on a voyage from Halifax, Nova Scotia to Quebec City, Province of Canada, British North America.
Eliza	United Kingdom	The ship struck a rock in the Pentland Firth and was holed. She was abandoned in the North Sea two days later with the loss of four of her five crew. She was on a voyage from Liverpool to Dundee, Forfarshire.
Luiz d'Abkerque	Netherlands	The ship caught fire at Albreda, Gambia Colony and was scuttled.

== 10 May ==
List of shipwrecks: 10 May 1844
Ship	State	Description
Ann	United Kingdom	The barque was driven ashore in the River Plate. She was refloated.
George and Mary	United Kingdom	The brig was driven ashore at Montevideo, Uruguay.
Lord Wenlock	United Kingdom	The ship was driven ashore at Saint John, New Brunswick, British North America. She was on a voyage from Saint John to Hull, Yorkshire. She was refloated the next day and resumed her voyage.
Minerva	Spain	The brig was driven ashore at Buceo, Uruguay.
Susan	United States	The brig was driven ashore at Montevideo.
Whitby	United Kingdom	The ship caught fire and sank at Dundee, Forfarshire.

== 11 May ==
List of shipwrecks: 11 May 1844
Ship	State	Description
Gran Canarie	Spain	The barque capsized at Buenos Aires, Argentina. She was on a voyage from Buenos Aires to Havana, Cuba.
HMS Gorgon	Royal Navy	The paddle steamer was driven ashore in the River Plate. She was later refloated.
Lotus	United Kingdom	The barque was damaged by ice in the Atlantic Ocean and foundered. Her crew were rescued by Swallow (United Kingdom). Lotus was on a voyage from Bristol, Gloucestershire to Quebec City, Province of Canada, British North America.
Nathaniel Hooper	United States	The ship was driven ashore on Governors Island, New York. She was on a voyage from New York to Cádiz, Spain. She was refloated and taken in to New York.

== 12 May ==
List of shipwrecks: 12 May 1844
Ship	State	Description
Emerald	United Kingdom	The ship was driven ashore at Flamborough Head, Yorkshire. She was on a voyage from Sunderland, County Durham to London. She was refloated on 14 May.
Ernesto	Spain	The brig was wrecked on Heneagua. She was on a voyage from Marseille, Bouches-du-Rhône, France to Barcelona and New Orleans, Louisiana, United States.
Neptune	United Kingdom	The brig was abandoned in the Atlantic Ocean. Her crew were rescued by a French brig. She was on a voyage from Dominica to London.

== 13 May ==
List of shipwrecks: 13 May 1844
Ship	State	Description
Henry Holland	United Kingdom	The ship was driven ashore on Saltholm, Denmark. She was on a voyage from Riga, Russia to Montrose, Forfarshire. She was refloated.
Bridget Archibald	United Kingdom	The ship was driven ashore in the Rio Grande.
James Mercer	United Kingdom	The ship was driven ashore in the Rio Grande.
Lady Lovat	United Kingdom	The ship was driven ashore north of Fyns Hoved, Denmark. Her crew were rescued. She was on a voyage from Newcastle upon Tyne, Northumberland to Odense, Denmark.
Neptune	United Kingdom	The brig foundered in the Atlantic Ocean (32°30′N 59°00′W). Her crew were rescued by the brig L'Eclaire (France). Neptune was on a voyage from Dominica to London.
Orion	United Kingdom	The ship ran aground at Copt Point, Kent. She was on a voyage from London to Africa. She was refloated and resumed her voyage.
Oude Werf	Norway	The ship was wrecked near Aalborg, Denmark. She was on a voyage from "Limmar" to Dram.

== 14 May ==
List of shipwrecks: 14 May 1844
Ship	State	Description
King William	United Kingdom	The ship was driven ashore and wrecked at "Parello", 18 nautical miles (33 km) from Valencia, Spain. She was on a voyage from Marseille, Bouches-du-Rhône, France to Falmouth, Cornwall.
Lady Leitrim	United Kingdom	The ship was wrecked on the Bird Island Reef. Her crew were rescued. She was on a voyage from Dublin to Antigua.
Margaret Ann	(United Kingdom of Great Britain and Ireland) British North America	The ship was wrecked on Goose Island. She was on a voyage from Halifax, Nova Scotia to a port in Labrador.
Nicole Benjamin	France	The ship was driven ashore and sank east of Calais. Her crew were rescued. She was on a voyage from Fredrikstad, Denmark to Honfleur, Calvados.
Roscius	United States	The ship ran aground on the Arklow Bank, in the Irish Sea off the coast of County Wicklow, United Kingdom. She was on a voyage from Liverpool, Lancashire, United Kingdom to New York. She was refloated and resumed her voyage.

== 15 May ==
List of shipwrecks: 15 May 1844
Ship	State	Description
Gleaner	United States	The ship was driven ashore at Falmouth, Jamaica and was abandoned by her crew.
Pallas	Flag unknown	The ship ran aground on the Ooster Reef, in the Baltic Sea off Lübeck. She was on a voyage from Stockholm, Sweden to Lübeck.

== 16 May ==
List of shipwrecks: 16 May 1844
Ship	State	Description
Celia	United Kingdom	The ship struck a sunken rock and was damaged off Penzance, Cornwall. She was on a voyage from Cardiff, Glamorgan to Penzance.
Dulcinea	United Kingdom	The ship was driven ashore in Bangor Bay.

== 17 May ==
List of shipwrecks: 17 May 1844
Ship	State	Description
Balcombe	United Kingdom	The ship was driven ashore south of Fraserburgh, Aberdeenshire. She was on a voyage from Aberdeen to Banff.
Derritend	United Kingdom	The flat was wrecked near the Formby Lightship ( Trinity House). Her crew were rescued. She was on a voyage from Walney Island, Lancashire to Runcorn, Cheshire.
Granger	United Kingdom	The ship ran aground on the Falsterboe Reef, off the coast of Sweden. She was on a voyage from Newcastle upon Tyne, Northumberland to Saint Petersburg, Russia. She was refloated the next day and resumed her voyage.
Guernsey Lily	(United Kingdom of Great Britain and Ireland) Guernsey	The ship was driven ashore and wrecked on the coast of Portuguese West Africa. Her crew were rescued by the barque Charles (United Kingdom, which lost two men.
Mary Frances	United Kingdom	The ship was wrecked on the Buccoo Reef. She was on a voyage from Dominica to Trinidad.
Royal Adelaide	United Kingdom	The ship ran aground in the Victoria Channel and was damaged. She was on a voyage from Liverpool, Lancashire to Baltimore, Maryland, United States. She was refloated and put back to Liverpool in a leaky condition.

== 18 May ==
List of shipwrecks: 18 May 1844
Ship	State	Description
Bache	United Kingdom	The ship ran aground at Cork. She was refloated.
Comet	United Kingdom	The ship was driven ashore near Whitby, Yorkshire.
John Mitchell	United Kingdom	The ship ran aground at Cork. She was refloated.
Jonge Johan von Letten	Netherlands	The ship was driven ashore on the Dutch coast.
Levant Star	United Kingdom	The brig sprang a leak and foundered in the English Channel off St Alban's Head, Dorset. Her crew survived. She was on a voyage from Newport, Monmouthshire to Rotterdam, South Holland, Netherlands.
Petrel	United Kingdom	The smack was wrecked in Whitsand Bay.
Ranger	United Kingdom	The ship was wrecked on Foreland Point, Ireland.

== 19 May ==
List of shipwrecks: 19 May 1844
Ship	State	Description
Active	United Kingdom	The ship was driven ashore near Saint Aubin, Jersey, Channel Islands. She was on a voyage from Swansea, Glamorgan to Rouen, Seine-Inférieure, France.
Catherina; Eclipse	United Kingdom; Duchy of Holstein	The ships collided off the French coast and both foundered. Their crews were rescued by Seven Soskende (Norway). Catherina was on a voyage from Cardiff, Glamorgan to Altona. Eclipse was on a voyage from Harwich, Essex, United Kingdom to Altona.
Edouard	France	The ship was wrecked at Bay Roberts, Newfoundland, British North America. All on board were rescued. She was on a voyage from Havre de Grâce, Seine-Inférieure to Port Royal, Jamaica.
Catherine	United Kingdom	The schooner was in collision with the brig Louisa (United Kingdom) and foundered in the English Channel off St. Catherine's Point, Isle of Wight with the loss of six of the eight people on board. Survivors were rescued by the brig Nuevo Ramoncito (Spain). Catherine was on a voyage from Gravesend, Kent to Liverpool, Lancashire.
Margaret	United Kingdom	The ship was driven ashore at Magilligan Point, County Londonderry.
Union	United Kingdom	The ship foundered in the North Sea off Orfordness, Suffolk. She was on a voyage from London to Harlingen, Friesland, Netherlands.

== 20 May ==
List of shipwrecks: 20 May 1844
Ship	State	Description
Britannia	United Kingdom	The ship ran aground on the Half Ebb Rock. She was refloated and taken in to Harwich, Essex.
Enterprise	United Kingdom	The ship departed from Truro, Nova Scotia, British North America for Boston, Massachusetts. Subsequently sighted in the Bay of Fundy, after which no further trace. Presumed foundered with the loss of all hands.
Giletta	Danzig	The ship ran aground on Saltholm, Denmark. She was on a voyage from Danzig to Hull, Yorkshire, United Kingdom. She was refloated the next day and resumed her voyage.
Red Rover	United Kingdom	The ship was driven ashore at Scrabster, Caithness. Her crew were rescued. She was on a voyage from Aberdeen to Ichaboe Island, Portuguese West Africa.
San Jose Venusos	Brazil	The ship was in collision with an American whaler and foundered. Her crew were rescued She was on a voyage from Pernambuco to Bahia.
Squirrel	(United Kingdom of Great Britain and Ireland) British North America	The schooner was wrecked. Her crew were rescued.
Susan	United Kingdom	The ship ran aground at the Carlingford Lighthouse. She was on a voyage from Odesa to Newry, County Antrim. Susan was refloated and taken in to Newry.
Zitella	Danzig	The ship was driven ashore on Saltholm, Denmark. She was on a voyage from Danzig to Hull. She was refloated the next day and resumed her voyage.

== 21 May ==
List of shipwrecks: 21 May 1844
Ship	State	Description
Annette Dorothea	Norway	The ship was driven ashore near "Cobourg", France.
Corsair	United Kingdom	The ship was wrecked on "Langlois Island". Her crew were rescued. She was on a voyage from Sydney, Nova Scotia to Saint John's, Newfoundland, British North America.
John and Madby	United Kingdom	The ship caught fire at Peterhead, Aberdeenshire. She was on a voyage from Sunderland, County Durham to Nairn.
Saladin	United Kingdom	The barque was taken by her muninous crew. She was subsequently wrecked on Harbour Island, Newfoundland, British North America with the loss of all but six of her crew. She was on a voyage from Valparaíso, Chile to London.

== 23 May ==
List of shipwrecks: 23 May 1844
Ship	State	Description
Challenger	United Kingdom	The ship was driven ashore near Key West, Florida Territory. She was on a voyage from Galveston, Republic of Texas to Liverpool, Lancashire. She was refloated on 28 May and taken in to Key West.
Chance	United Kingdom	The ship was abandoned in the Atlantic Ocean. Her crew were rescued. She was on a voyage from Havana, Cuba to Swansea, Glamorgan.
Fama	United Kingdom	The ship was wrecked at Terra Penna, Kingdom of the Two Sicilies. She was on a voyage from Trieste to Saint Petersburg, Russia.
Femegina Elizabeth	Hamburg	The ship ran aground on the Kleine Nagelsand. She was on a voyage from Hamburg to Nantes, Loire-Inférieure.
Florence	United Kingdom	The ship was driven ashore near Pictou, Nova Scotia, British North America. She was on a voyage from Plymouth, Devon to Quebec City, Province of Canada, British North America. She was refloated and towed in to Charlottetown, Prince Edward Island.
Tees	United Kingdom	The collier, a brig, ran aground on the Steil Sand, in the North Sea. She was refloated.

== 24 May ==
List of shipwrecks: 24 May 1844
Ship	State	Description
Industry	United States	The ship caught fire and was abandoned. Her crew were rescued. She was on a voyage from New York to Halifax, Nova Scotia, British North America.
Rapide	France	The ship ran aground on the Goodwin Sands, Kent, United Kingdom. She was on a voyage from Marseille, Bouches-du-Rhône to Falmouth, Cornwall, United Kingdom. She was refloated and put in to Ramsgate, Kent.

== 25 May ==
List of shipwrecks: 28 May 1844
Ship	State	Description
Carolina Matilda	Norway	The ship was driven ashore and wrecked at Asnelles, Calvados, France with the presumed loss of all hands. She was on a voyage from Moss to Caen, Calvados.
Scotia	Malta	The paddle steamer ran aground and was damaged at Tunis, Beylik of Tunis with the loss of a crew member. She was refloated and put back to Malta for repairs.

== 27 May ==
List of shipwrecks: 28 May 1844
Ship	State	Description
William	United Kingdom	The ship ran aground on the Hamstead Ledge, off the Isle of Wight. She was on a voyage from Youghal, County Cork to Portsmouth, Hampshire. She was refloated the next day and resumed her voyage.

== 28 May ==
List of shipwrecks: 28 May 1844
Ship	State	Description
Diamond	United Kingdom	The ship ran aground on the Woolpack Sand. She was on a voyage from London to Calcutta, India. She was refloated but ran aground on the Red Sand. Diamond was towed in to the River Thames.
Perseverance	United Kingdom	The ship ran aground on a sunken rock off Ardnamurchan, Argyllshire. Her crew were rescued. She was on a voyage from Liverpool, Lancashire to Wick, Caithness.
William	United Kingdom	The ship ran aground on the Spaniard Sand and sank. Her crew were rescued. She was on a voyage from London to Rouen, Seine-Inférieure, France.

== 29 May ==
List of shipwrecks: 29 May 1844
Ship	State	Description
Aurora Fortuna	Norway	The ship ran aground on the Cockle Sand, in the North Sea off the coast of Norfolk, United Kingdom. She was on a voyage from Christiania to London, United Kingdom. She was refloated and beached at Great Yarmouth, Norfolk, where she was wrecked.
San Joze Vencedor	Brazil	The ship was in collision with an American whaler and foundered. Her crew were rescued. She was on a voyage from Pernambuco to Bahia.

== 30 May ==
List of shipwrecks: 30 May 1844
Ship	State	Description
Caroline	Hamburg	The barque was destroyed by fire off the west coast of Costa Rica. Her crew were rescued.

== 31 May ==
List of shipwrecks: 31 May 1844
Ship	State	Description
Jordeson	United Kingdom	The ship ran aground on the Droogden Sandbank. She was on a voyage from Danzig to Antwerp, Belgium.
Sir George Prevost	United Kingdom	The ship was wrecked at Cape Hinchenbrooke, Nova Scotia, British North America. All on board, more than 120 people, were rescued. She was on a voyage from Newry, County Antrim to Quebec City, Province of Canada, British North America.

== Unknown date ==
List of shipwrecks: Unknown date in May 1844
Ship	State	Description
Bourvoyeur	France	The ship foundered whilst on a voyage from Caen, Calvados to Hull, Yorkshire, United Kingdom.
Challenge	United Kingdom	The ship ran aground on the Marcus Keys. She was on a voyage from Galveston, Texas Republic to an English port. She was refloated and taken in to Key West, Florida Territory, where she arrived on 29 May.
Content	United States	The brig was wrecked at Metis, Province of Canada, British North America before 1 June.
Courier	United Kingdom	The schooner foundered in the Baltic Sea off the coast of Prussia.
Julius Frein Schimbristchunn	Rostock	The ship was abandoned in the Baltic Sea. She was subsequently towed in to "Luchenten".
Mania	United Kingdom	The ship ran aground on the Brake Sand, in the North Sea. She was on a voyage from Calcutta, India to London. She was later refloated and taken in tow.
Maria Teresa	Grand Duchy of Tuscany	The brig was driven ashore at "Realless" and became hogged. She was refloated and made for a port in Peru.
Prince Albert	(United Kingdom of Great Britain and Ireland) British North America	The ship was abandoned in the Atlantic Ocean before 22 May.
Prosperite	France	The ship was wrecked on the coast of Spain. She was on a voyage from Marseille, Bouches-du-Rhône to Nantes, Loire-Inférieure.
Purvoyeur	France	The ship was lost whilst on a voyage from Caen, Calvados to Hull, Yorkshire, United Kingdom.
Tom Wood	United States	The schooner was abandoned in the Atlantic Ocean before 12 May.
Union	Bremen	The ship was driven ashore and severely damaged at Galveston, Texas Republic before 30 May.
William Johnson	United Kingdom	The ship ran sground on the Spaniard Sandbank and sank. Her crew were rescued. She was on a voyage from London to Rouen, Seine-Inférieure, France.
