= Syberg Keramik =

Danish ceramics manufacturer

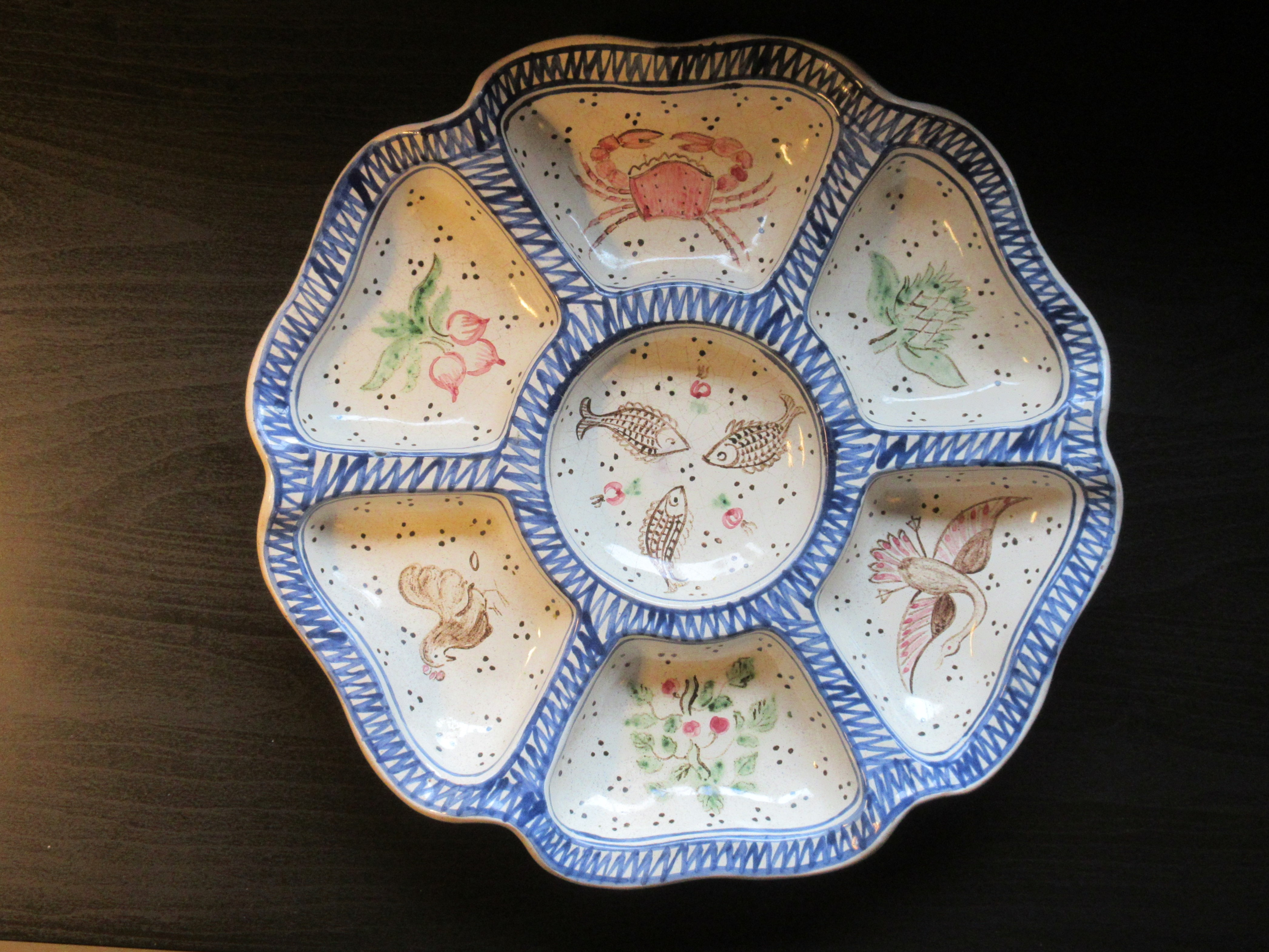
Compartment platter by Lars Suberg

Syberg Keramik was a Danish ceramics manufacturer based in the Valby district of Copenhagen, Denmark. It was created by Hans Syberg and later taken over by his brother Lars Syberg. It existed from 1928 until the 1980s and was based in Valby.

== History ==
Hans Syberg was a son of the artists Fritz and Anna Syberg. Together with his cousin Grete Jensen, a daughter of the painter Peter Hansen, he established a ceramics workshop in Valby in 1928. They specialized in faience with flower decorations inspired by Anna Syberg's watercolours.

Lars Syberg joined the company in 1931 and gradually took it over. The production peaked during the 1940s and early 1950s. The company remained in operation until the 1980s.

== Exhibitions and books ==
Faaborg Museum in Faaborg and Sophienholm in Kongens Lyngby north of Copenhagen hosted the exhibition Syberg - fra akvarel til keramik ("Syberg - from Watercolour to Ceramics") in 2003–04. Jens Blædel published a book by the same name in connection with the exhibition. Ceramics from Syberg Keramik was also featured at the exhibition Kunstnerdynastiet Syberg at the Johannes Larsen Museum in Kerteminde.

== See also ==
- Porcelænsfabrikken Danmark
