= Korshavn =

Korshavn may refer to:

- Korshavn Bay, a bay of northeastern Funen in Denmark
- Korshavn, Norway, a fishing village in the municipality of Hvaler in Østfold county, Norway
- Korshavn, or Korshamn, a fishing village in the municipality of Lyngdal in Vest-Agder county, Norway
  - Korshavn Chapel, or Korshamn Chapel, a church in the municipality of Lyngdal in Vest-Agder county, Norway
