= Keramik (disambiguation) =

Keramik most commonly refers to Amfepramone, a stimulant drug. Keramik may also refer to:

- Keramik, Ukraine, an urban-type settlement
- FC Keramik Baranivka
- Höganäs Keramik
- Kähler Keramik
- Keramik-Museum Berlin
- Syberg Keramik
- Søholm Keramik
