= Franz Syberg =

Danish composer

Franz Adolf Syberg (5 July 1904 - 11 December 1955) was a Danish composer.

== Life ==
Syberg was born in Kerteminde, Funen, to the painters Anna and Fritz Syberg. He moved to Leipzig in 1922 where he studied musical composition and music theory at the Leipzig Conservatory with Sigfrid Karg-Elert and Werner Hübschmann. He left for Copenhagen in 1928, where he studied organ with Peter Thomsen.

He was appointed organist at Kerteminde in 1932, where he remained for the rest of his life. His 1931 Quintet for flute, clarinet and string trio was chosen in 1938 to be performed at the International Society for Contemporary Music in London and the Nordic Music Days in Copenhagen. The years following this saw the composition of his most mature works, ending in 1942, when he stopped composing. His work was largely forgotten until 1990, when seven of his compositions were performed at the Musikhøst festival in Odense. Much of his work has now been published and performed.

His music has much in common with German neo-classicism similar to Hindemith, with much counterpoint and dense linearity, resulting in some harsh and dissonant harmonies. His more mature works show the influence of Carl Nielsen.

== Compositions ==
Manuscripts are in the Kongelige Bibliotek, Copenhagen
Publisher: Kontrapunkt

=== Stage ===
- Uffe hin Spage (marionette play, S. Clausen), 1929
- Leonce og Lena (G. Büchner), 1931
- Ett drömspel (A. Strindberg), 1941–1942

=== Orchestral ===
- Music for oboe and string orchestra, 1933
- Sinfonietta, 1934–1935
- Adagio for string orchestra, 1938
- Symphony, 1939

=== Chamber ===
- String Quartet, 1930
- Quintet for flute, clarinet, and string trio, 1931
- Concertino for oboe and string quintet, 1932
- String Trio, 1933
- Quartet for oboe and string trio, 1933
- Wind Quintet, 1940
- Octet for wind instruments, 1941

=== Organ ===
- Chaconne, 1933
- Prelude, Intermezzo, and Fugato, 1934

== Sources ==
- Bertel Krarup: 'Syberg, Franz Adolf', Grove Music Online ed. L. Macy (Accessed [Day Month Year of access]), <http://www.grovemusic.com >
