= 2021 Kerteminde municipal election =

← 2017	16 November 2021	2025 →

All 25 seats to the Kerteminde Municipal Council 13 seats needed for a majority
- Turnout: 14,090 (72.6%) ▼4.0pp
	First party	Second party	Third party
	A	C	V
Party	Social Democrats	Conservatives	Venstre
Last election	7 seats, 23.3%	7 seats, 21.4%	3 seats, 11.9%
Seats won	10	9	2
Seat change	▲3	▲2	▼1
Popular vote	5,075	4,616	971
Percentage	36.6%	33.3%	7.0%
Swing	▲13.3%	▲11.9%	▼4.9%
	Fourth party	Fifth party	Sixth party
	F	O	Ø
Party	Green Left	Danish People's Party	Red–Green Alliance
Last election	2 seats, 8.2%	3 seats, 12.2%	1 seat, 6.2%
Seats won	1	1	1
Seat change	▼1	▼2	0
Popular vote	763	639	595
Percentage	5.5%	4.6%	4.3%
Swing	▼2.7%	▼7.6%	▼1.9%
	Seventh party	Eighth party
	D	B
Party	New Right	Social Liberals
Last election	Did Not Stand	1 seat, 6.5%
Seats won	1	0
Seat change	▲1	▼1
Popular vote	593	382
Percentage	4.3%	2.8%
Swing	New	▼3.7%
Mayor before election
Kasper Olesen
Social Democrats
Mayor after election
Kasper Olesen
Social Democrats

The 2017 election, resulted in Kasper Olesen from the Social Democrats becoming mayor, but not without drama. The election resulted in both the Social Democrats and the Conservatives winning 7 seats. This was while Venstre who had held the mayor's position in the period up to the election, only won 3 seats. They tried to have a majority behind them holding the mayor's position once again, however without luck. After many days of negotiations, they eventually opted for supporting Kasper Olesen for mayor. This was untraditional, since Conservatives and Venstre are in the same political bloc.

Because of the dramatic and uncommon result, and that the Conservatives were having great opinion polls nationwide, it was speculated that they would have a good chance to win the mayor's position this time. Conservatives and Venstre were part of an electoral alliance with the New Right and Danish People's Party. This suggested that they would be ready to give one of them the mayor's position, if a majority was won.

In the result, both the Social Democrats and Conservatives would increase their vote share by more than 10%, and would gain 3 and 2 seats respectively. A majority in the electoral alliance mentioned above was won. However Danish People's Party would drop its support to a mayor from the blue bloc, and suddenly Kasper Olesen would once again have an untraditional majority behind him, being the Social Democrats, the Green Left, Danish People's Party and the Red–Green Alliance.

== Electoral system ==
For elections to Danish municipalities, a number varying from 9 to 31 are chosen to be elected to the municipal council. The seats are then allocated using the D'Hondt method and a closed list proportional representation. Kerteminde Municipality had 25 seats in 2021

Unlike in Danish General Elections, in elections to municipal councils, electoral alliances are allowed.

== Electoral alliances ==
=== Electoral Alliance 1 ===
Party		Political alignment
B	Social Liberals	Centre to Centre-left
K	Christian Democrats	Centre to Centre-right

=== Electoral Alliance 2 ===
Party		Political alignment
C	Conservatives	Centre-right
D	New Right	Right-wing to Far-right
O	Danish People's Party	Right-wing to Far-right
V	Venstre	Centre-right

=== Electoral Alliance 3 ===
Party		Political alignment
A	Social Democrats	Centre-left
F	Green Left	Centre-left to Left-wing
Ø	Red–Green Alliance	Left-wing to Far-Left

== Results by polling station ==
L = Frie Lokale

Division	A	B	C	D	F	K	L	O	V	Ø
Division	%	%	%	%	%	%	%	%	%	%
Mesinge	30.2	4.1	26.6	3.3	8.2	0.6	0.6	11.5	7.5	7.5
Kerteminde 1	31.2	3.7	35.7	4.2	6.5	0.4	2.1	3.5	8.1	4.8
Nymarken	33.5	2.6	25.5	6.2	5.3	1.0	1.9	7.7	9.3	7.1
Marslev	38.5	2.5	30.9	5.9	5.5	1.3	0.9	5.7	6.5	2.2
Munkebo	46.6	1.7	27.9	4.1	5.1	0.9	0.3	3.5	5.8	4.0
Langeskov	37.0	2.0	44.1	3.3	3.1	0.5	0.1	2.5	5.4	1.8

== Results ==
Party		Votes	%	+/-	Seats	+/-
Kerteminde Municipality
A	Social Democrats	5,075	36.57	+13.26	10	+3
C	Conservatives	4,616	33.26	+11.81	9	+2
V	Venstre	971	7.00	-4.88	2	-1
F	Green Left	763	5.50	-2.68	1	-1
O	Danish People's Party	639	4.60	-7.58	1	-2
Ø	Red-Green Alliance	595	4.29	-1.89	1	0
D	New Right	593	4.27	New	1	New
B	Social Liberals	382	2.75	-3.76	0	-1
L	Frie Lokale	146	1.05	New	0	New
K	Christian Democrats	99	0.71	New	0	New
Total		13,879	100	N/A	25	N/A
Invalid votes		44	0.23	-0.01		
Blank votes		167	0.86	-0.24		
Turnout		14,090	72.64	-3.97		
Source: valg.dk
