= Namibian drumlins =

Geologic feature in Namibia

The Namibian drumlins are a geologic feature in Namibia. Since drumlins only occur as the result of glaciers, researchers determined they are the relic of an ice age in the late Paleozoic Era. The researchers measured the supposed rock drumlins with satellite imagery available on the Internet. "Megalineations" including rock drumlins were described at approximately 20°33′S 14°21′E, between Twyfelfontein and Xaragu Camp.
