= Frederik Storch =

Danish genre painter

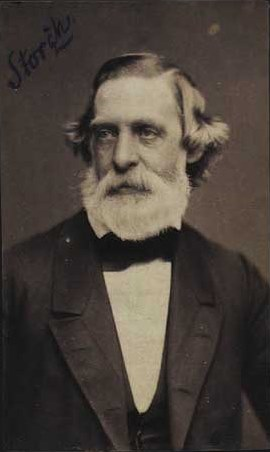
Frederik Storch, photographed by Peter Most

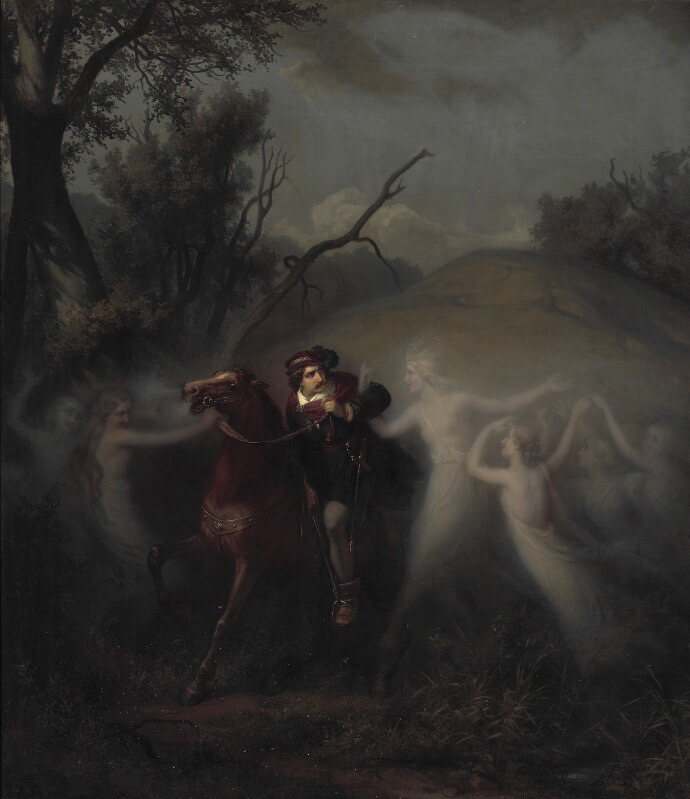
A Nobleman is Lured by Elven Girls

Italian orange pickers, dancing and playing music at the Bay of Naples (1847)

Frederik Ludvig Storch (July 21, 1805 – September 2, 1883) was a Danish genre painter.

== Biography ==
Storch was born in Kerteminde on the island of Fyn, Denmark. He was the son of Hannibal Samuel Storch (1775–1817) and Eleonore Christine Kamp (1772–1849). His father was a parish priest and vicar. Storch studied at the Royal Danish Academy of Fine Arts in Copenhagen. In 1828, he made his debut at the Charlottenborg Spring Exhibition. In 1832 he went to the suburb of Schwabing in Munich which was forming a small Danish artist colony. He associated with fellow artists Niels Simonsen (1807–1885) and Christian Andreas Schleisner (1810–1882). In 1845–46, he traveled to Italy. He stayed at Munich until 1852. He became a professor at the Royal Academy upon his return to Denmark.

== Personal life ==
In 1830, he had married his cousin Gertrudmine Claudine Kamp (1811–1881). He died during 1883 and was buried at the Cemetery of Holmen (Holmens Kirkegård).

== Other sources ==
- "Storch, Frederik Ludvig". Cyclopedia of Painters and Paintings. Vol. 4. C. Scribner's Sons. 1913. pp. 231–232. ISBN 9780804605359.
