= Kerteminde Fjord =

Fjord in Denmark

Coordinates: 55°26′39″N 10°33′58″E

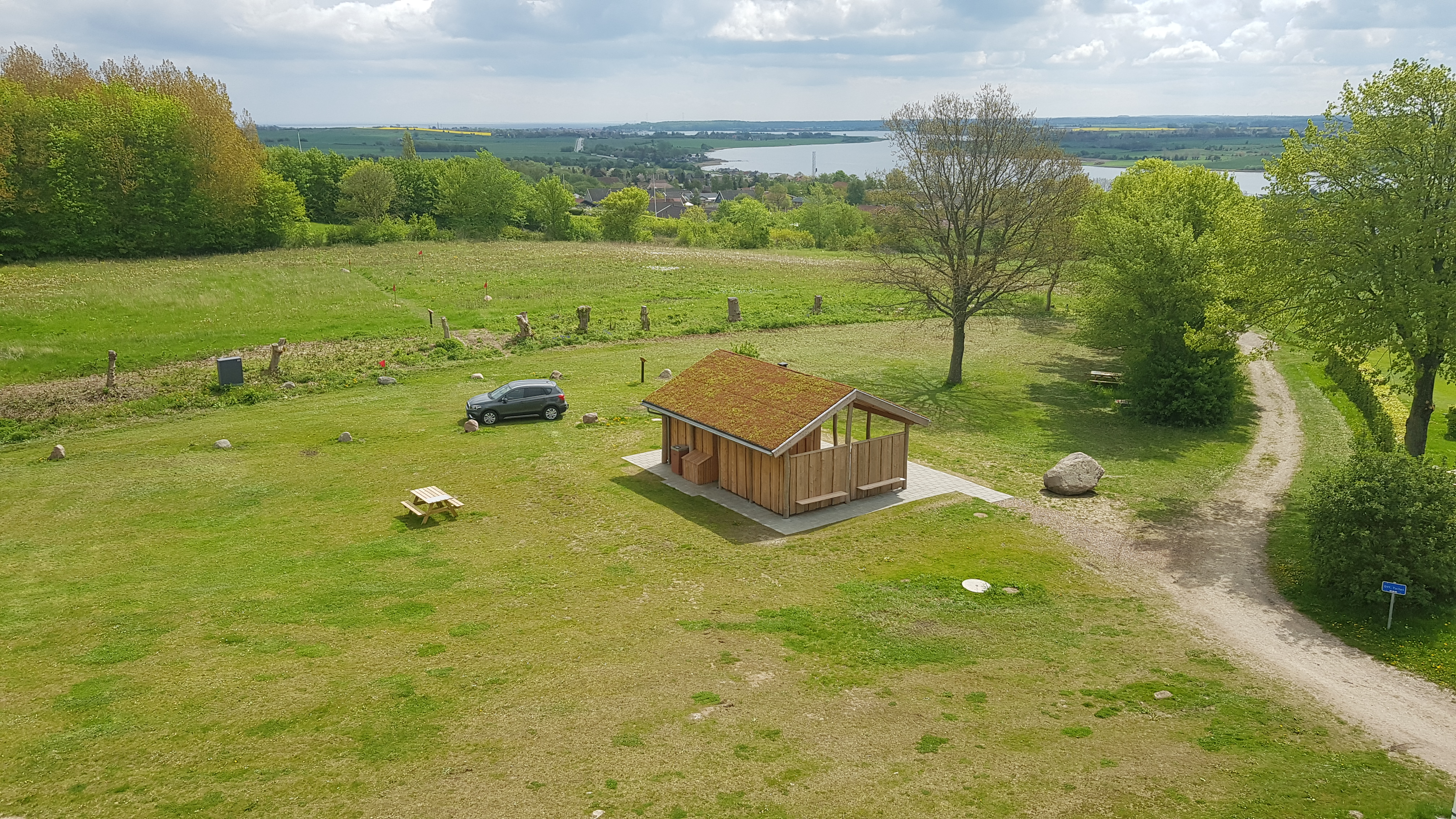
The eastern parts of Kerteminde Fjord seen from the tower on Munkebo Hill

Kerteminde Fjord is a fjord of northeastern Funen, Denmark, south of the Odense Fjord. It stretches inland from the town of Kerteminde. The villages of Kertinge and Kolstrup are on the southeastern shore and Munkebo is to the north.
