= Thor Pedersen (traveller) =

Danish tourist, traveller and adventurer

Torbjørn C. Pedersen
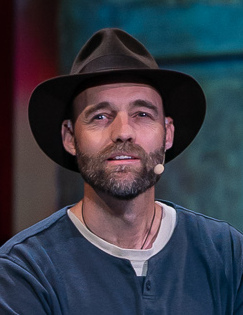
- Pedersen in 2024
- Born: 19 December 1978 (age 47); Kerteminde, Denmark

Torbjørn C. "Thor" Pedersen (born 19 December 1978) is a Danish traveller and adventurer known for the Once Upon a Saga project: a journey to visit every country in the world without the use of air travel. The project began in 2013 and lasted for over nine years, and Pedersen visited all of the planned 203 nations before finally returning to Denmark by ship. He is, next to Graham Hughes, the first known person to have travelled through every country on the planet without using a plane. While Hughes interrupted his world tour to travel to his home country by plane, Pedersen travelled continuously without interruption.

== Early life ==
Torbjørn Cederlöf Pedersen was born on 19 December 1978 in Kerteminde, Denmark, to Torben Pedersen (Danish) and Ylva Cederlöf (Finnish). The family moved to Vancouver, Canada, then to Toronto, and after that to New Jersey, United States, over a period of six years. He returned to Denmark in 1984, where he spent his childhood growing up in Kerteminde and Bryrup. He entered business school at Silkeborg Handelsskole, Silkeborg.

Pedersen graduated as a merchant student in 1998. He was drafted into the military later the same year, serving as a royal life guard at the royal palaces throughout Denmark. He was later a United Nations soldier for half a year in Eritrea and Ethiopia. Following an education in shipping and logistics, he worked several years abroad in Libya, Bangladesh, Kazakhstan, Azerbaijan, the United States, and other countries. When travelling abroad, Pedersen was nicknamed Thor.

== Once Upon a Saga ==
In 2013, Pedersen began planning a project which aimed at visiting every country in the world in a single unbroken journey explicitly without the use of air transport. Graham Hughes holds the world record of fastest visiting all countries by public surface transport, according to Guinness World Records.

On 10 October 2013 at 10:10 am (10/10,10:10) Once Upon a Saga began at Dybbøl Mølle in Southern Denmark. Soon after that, Pedersen crossed into Germany by train. By January 2020, he had reached 194 of the intended 203 countries on all six inhabited continents without returning home.

He was originally expected to complete the project and return to Denmark again in 2020 after visiting his last country, the Maldives, in October 2020. His return to Denmark was delayed by nearly three years due to COVID-19 pandemic, during which time he was stuck in Hong Kong for two years.

The journey earned Pedersen media coverage in more than 100 countries. Notable outlets that have covered Pedersen's quest between 2013 and 2020 include Vice, BBC, Lonely Planet, National Geographic, Forbes, Al Jazeera, The Guardian, News.com.au, The National, and ABC.

He finished his journey on 26 July 2023, by returning to Aarhus, Denmark.

== Book ==
- The Impossible Journey: An Incredible Voyage through Every Country in the World without Flying. 24 April 2025, Constable & Robinson, ISBN 978-1472149763
