= Fyns Hoved =

Bight in Funen, Denmark

Coordinates: 55°37′0″N 10°35′24″E

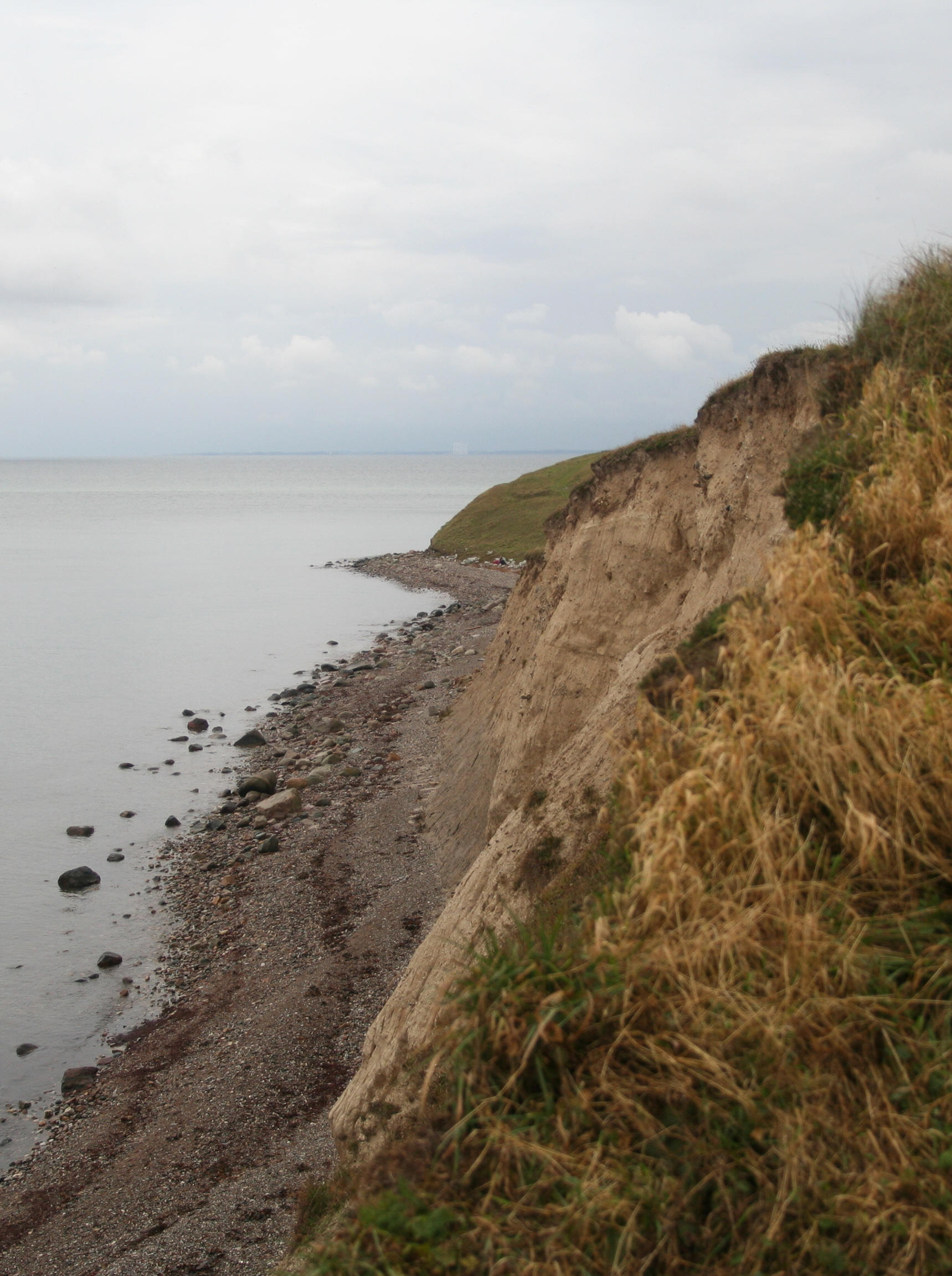
Fyns Hoved

Fyns Hoved is a bight of northeastern Funen, Denmark, curving south to form the approach to Odense Fjord. It is the northernmost point of Hindsholm and is thus Funen's northernmost point, dividing the Kattegat and the Great Belt. The eastern side of the bight between Fyns Hoved and Skoven, 5.5 metres (18 ft) to the south, is irregular, with a beach and hills behind it, and to the south of the bight is a small, shallow bay, Korshavn Bay, with the Korshavn Light in the vicinity. The bay is a natural harbour used by many yachtsmen.

Fyns Hoved is located in the dry Great Belt region, where rainfall is about 450 millimetres (18 in) per year compared to the national average of 650 millimetres (26 in) per year. This makes it hospitable to plants that are more common in the dry areas of southern Europe. The area is frequented by many shore birds and is also a resting place for migrating birds, and harbour porpoises can be seen offshore. Numerous artists such as Theodor Philipsen, Johannes Larsen and Fritz Syberg have found inspiration in the light and the scenery.

There are many stone walls in the area; these date back to 1810, when the seven farmers in the village of Nordskov decided to divide the area between them so that they would each have one northern and one southern strip of land. The seven cottagers had to content themselves with sharing one strip.

During the German occupation, barracks, a radar installation and artillery on Fyns Hoved guarded the entrance to the Great Belt.
