= Fritz Syberg =

Danish painter and illustrator

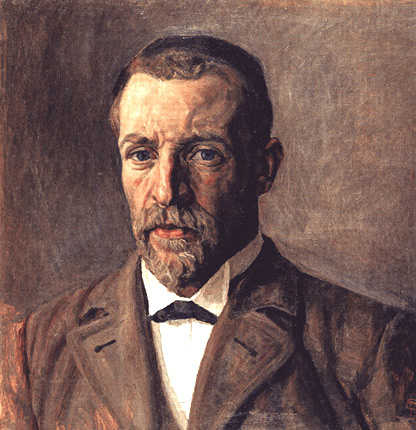
Fritz Syberg: Self-portrait (1910)

Christian Friedrich Wilhelm Heinrich Syberg, generally known as Fritz Syberg, (28 July 1862, Fåborg – 20 December 1939, Kerteminde) was a Danish painter and illustrator, one of the or Funen Painters (Fynboerne) living and working on the island of Funen.

== Biography ==
Syberg, from a poor background in Fåborg, first served a house painter's apprenticeship under Syrak Hansen, the father of fellow artist Peter Hansen before attending the Copenhagen Technical School in 1882 where Holger Grønvold taught him drawing. After a short period at the Danish Academy (spring 1884), he attended the Kunstnernes Frie Studieskoler (1885–1891) where he was the first of the Fynboerne to study under Kristian Zahrtmann. His travels included Sweden (1899) where he visited Johannes Larsen, Germany (1902), Italy (1905) together with Jens Birkholm, the Netherlands and Paris (1908) and Pisa (1910–1913). Syberg married Syrak Hansen's daughter Anna in 1894 and, after her death in 1914, he married her sister Marie in 1915. He was the father of artist Ernst Syberg and composer Franz Syberg.

== Artistic career ==
Together with Johannes Larsen, Poul S. Christiansen and Peter Hansen, Syberg was one of the first Funen artists to study under Zahrtmann who had broken away from the traditions of the Danish Academy to venture into Naturalism and Realism. Initially he was influenced by Zahrtmann's colourist approach which can be seen in Dødsfald (1892) depicting his mother's death in Fåborg's poorhouse 14 years earlier. After marrying Hansen's sister, the painter Anna Syberg, his works became brighter as evidenced by his landscapes and the 18 large drawings he completed in 1895 to 1898 to illustrate Hans Christian Andersen's The Story of a Mother, now considered to be among Denmark's finest drawings. Thereafter, his oils include Dødens komme (1906) and Døden ved vuggen (1907) and landscapes depicting scenes from Funen, first around Dyreborg and Svanninge such as Forår (1893) and Aftenleg i Svanninge Bakker (1900) and later the area west of Kerteminde where his garden and children were the main subjects. Quite early in his career, Syberg began to paint watercolours but it was during his three-year stay in Pisa with his family that he completed a whole series of watercolours adopting a style that was new to Danish art. But shortly after he returned to Denmark, on the occasion of his daughter Besse's marriage to Harald Giersing, Syberg came into contact with the younger generation of Danish artists, resulting in an increasingly Modernist approach and a return to oils as in Overkærby Bakke. Vinter (1917). His son Ernst Syberg also became an artist.

== Selected works ==
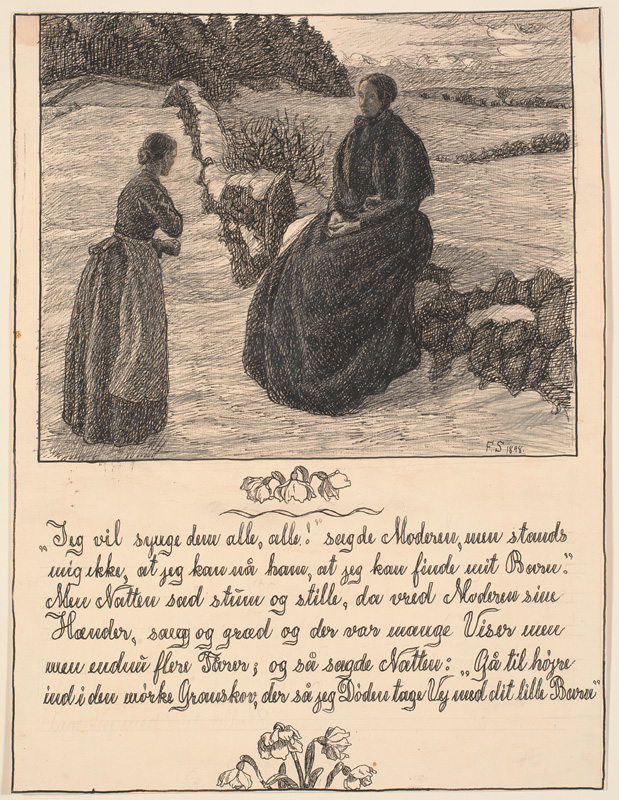
Frantz Syberg Jeg vil synge dem alle, alle!, sagde Moderen (1898). Illustration for Hans Christian Andersen's Historien om en moder

- Rugmark ved Svanninge (1887)
- Dødsfald (1892)
- Forår (1893)
- Historien om en moder (18 drawings, 1895–1898)
- Aftenlegg i Svanninge Bakker (1900)
- Børnene på Fyns Hoved (1905)
- Mor og datter ved Hverringe Strand (1906)
- Dødens komme (1906)
- Døden ved vuggen (1907)
- Sommerhytterne. Korshavn (1910)
- Efter badet, Italien (1911)
- Overkarby Bakke. Vinter (1917)
- Ved Morgenkaffen (1919)
- Komponisten (1936)

== Gallery ==
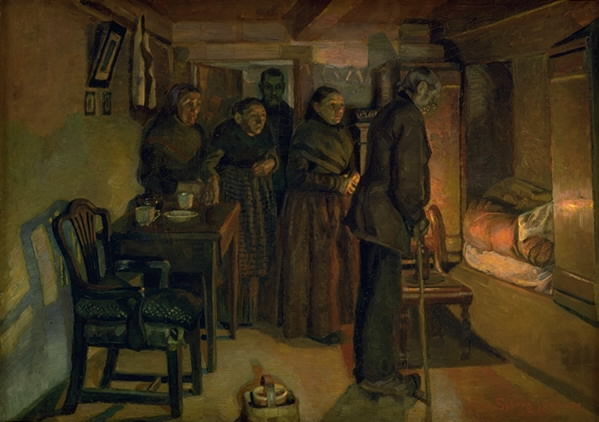
Fritz Syberg: Dødsfald (1892)

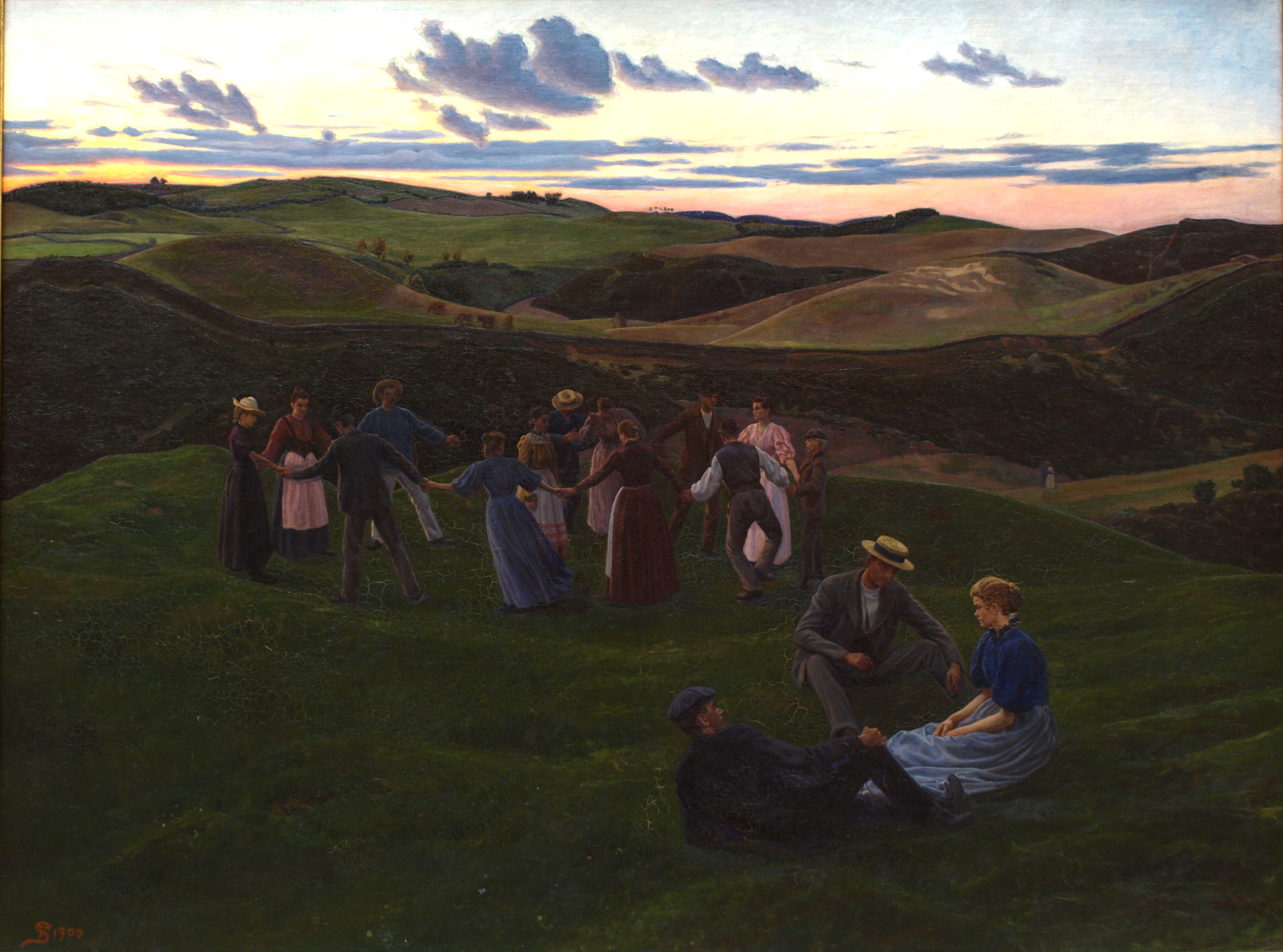
Fritz Syberg: Aftenleg i Svanninge Bakker (1900)

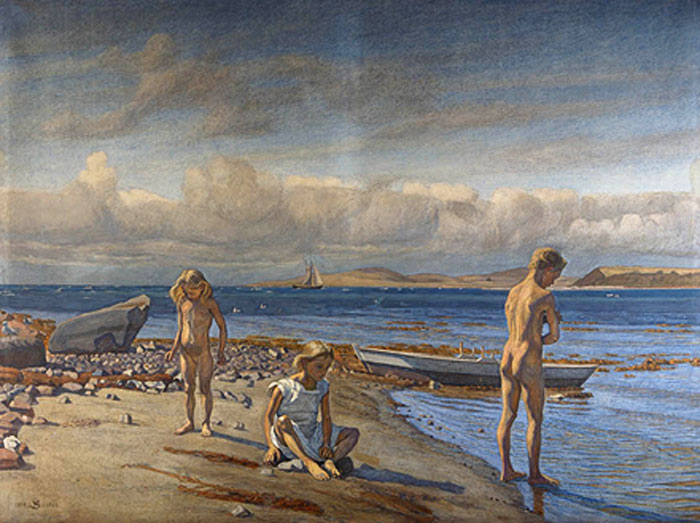
Fritz Syberg: Børnene på Fyns Hoved (1905)

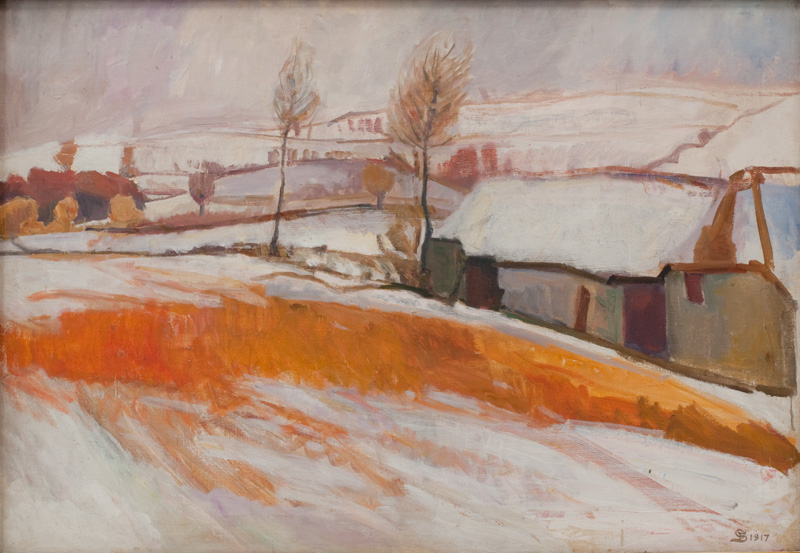
Fritz Syberg Overkærby Bakke. Vinter (1917)

== See also ==
- Syberg Keramik
