= Ernst Syberg =

Danish painter

Ernst Axel Syberg (12 January 1906 – 17 August 1981) was a Danish painter who in the early 1930s associated with the artists' colony in northwestern Zealand known as the Odsherred Painters. From 1934, he was a member of Corner where he exhibited his work.

== Biography ==
Son of the artists Fritz Syberg and Anna Syberg, Syberg was born in Kerteminde on the island of Funen. As an artist, he was self-taught but he had graduated in law from Copenhagen University in 1931. He became an associate of the painters Karl Bovin and Alfred Simonsen. He painted a considerable number of landscapes, both oils and watercolours, depicting the Danish countryside. Many of his works present scenes of summery skies above streams set among flowers and leafy bushes. Syberg was also fascinated by Italian art and architecture, sketching wall decorations in Florence and Rome, convinced that classical artists had been faced with the same problems he was confronted with himself. He developed some of these into paintings of Italian houses, streets and squares. He debuted at Kunstnernes Efterårsudstilling at Den Frie in 1933 and thereafter at Corner.
