= Korshavn Bay =

Bay in Funen, Denmark

Coordinates: 55°36′24″N 10°36′51″E

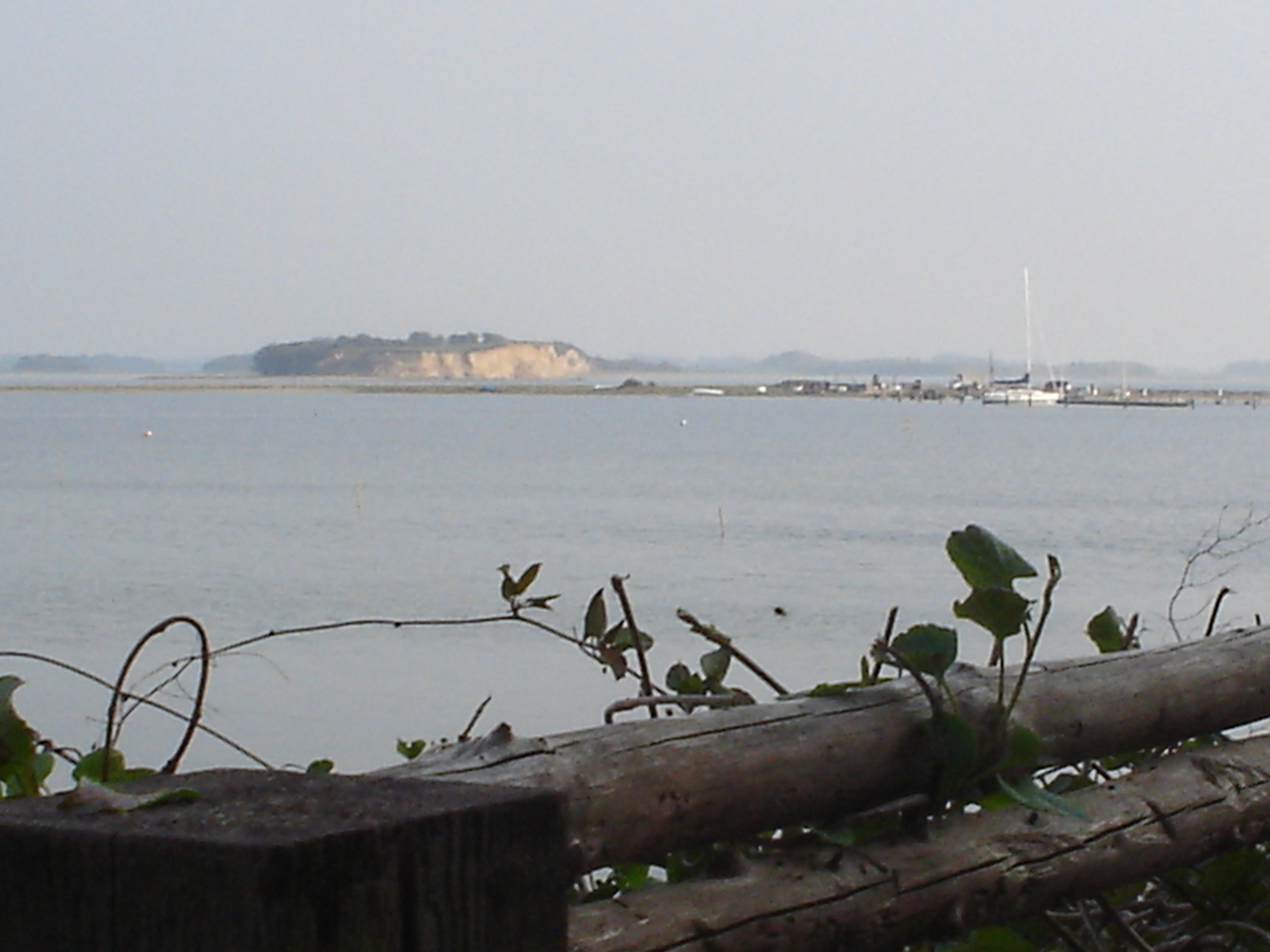
Korshavn with the small island Mejlø in the background

Korshavn Bay is a bay of northeastern Funen, Denmark, near the village of Nordskov. A small bay, it lies in the peninsula of Fyns Hoved, just to the south of the bight, and contains the Korshavn Light. The bay provides natural shelter to boaters.
