= Werner Hübschmann =

German composer

Werner Hübschmann (23 July 1901 − 5 July 1969) was a German composer and docent.

Hübschmann was born in Chemnitz. If one looks at the catalogue of works of the composer, folk music takes up the widest space in it. There for example, one can find music for mandolin orchestra and accordion, like the Sonatine for accordion or Toccata for accordion, but also instruments like the guitar and the zither which were considered by Hübschmann worth compositions.

After musical studies in Dresden and at the University of Music and Theatre Leipzig with Grabner and later with E. Wolff in Zurich he worked as a private music teacher in Leipzig and Chemnitz. On 1 October 1950, he was one of the co-founders of the Chemnitz Folk Music School. From 1952 he worked as a lecturer for composition at the Hochschule für Musik Franz Liszt, Weimar, the city where he died at the age of 68.

== Compositions ==
- Kein schöner Land : Volksliederbuch für Klavier.
- Von den Stämmen zum deutschen Volk : das erste Jahrtausend der deutschen Geschichte.
- Alte deutsche Spruchweisheit : für Tenor und Gitarre.
- Sieben Studien für Mandoline allein.
- Acht Stücke für Kontrabaß und Klavier.
- Sonatine für Trompette in B und Klavier.
