= Anna Syberg =

Danish painter (1870–1914)

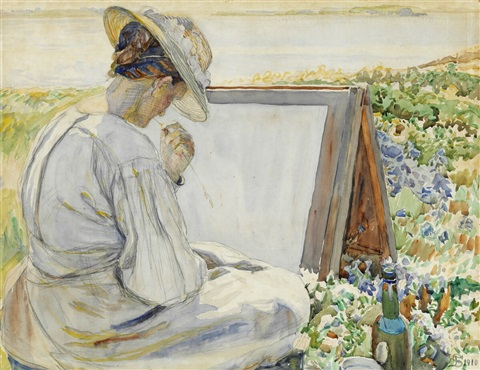
- Fritz Syberg; Anna Syberg at her easel, 1910
- Born: Anna Louise Birgitte Hansen; 7 January 1870; Faaborg, Denmark
- Died: 4 July 1914 (aged 44); Copenhagen, Denmark
- Known for: Painting
- Spouse: Fritz Syberg (m. 1894)

Anna Louise Birgitte Syberg (7 January 1870 – 4 July 1914) was a Danish painter. Together with her husband Fritz Syberg, she was one of the Funen Painters who lived and worked on the island of Funen. She is remembered for her lively watercolours of flower arrangements.

== Career ==
Anna Syberg attended the technical school in Faaborg after which she studied painting under Ludvig Brandstrup and Karl Jensen in Copenhagen. In 1882, she met Fritz Syberg who was serving an apprenticeship as a house painter with her father Peter Syrak Hansen. The two quickly fell for each other and after Anna had spent a period decorating porcelain at the Royal Copenhagen factory, they married in 1894 and set up home in the little village of Svanninge, just north of Faaborg. In 1902, they moved to Pilegården near Kerteminde, also on the island of Funen, where Anna became a close friend of Johannes Larsen, another member of the Fynboerne group of artists. From 1910 to 1913, the family spent three years at Pisa in Italy.

From 1898, Syberg exhibited at Charlottenborg and in 1912 her works were presented at Den Frie Udstilling. She was frequently a model for her husband and appears in several of his works. During her lifetime, she received little recognition for her work, often being referred to as a flower painter. This was probably due to the fact that it was difficult for women artists to enter what was essentially a men's world.

== Personal life ==
Anna Syberg was born in Faaborg, Denmark. Her father was artist Peter Syrak Hansen (1833-1904). She was the sister of artist Peter Hansen (1868–1928). She was the mother of several children including artist Ernst Syberg (1906–1981), composer Franz Syberg (1904-1955) and actress Johanne Marie Birgitte Giersing (1896–1944).

Syberg died in Copenhagen and was buried at Faaborg.

== Gallery ==
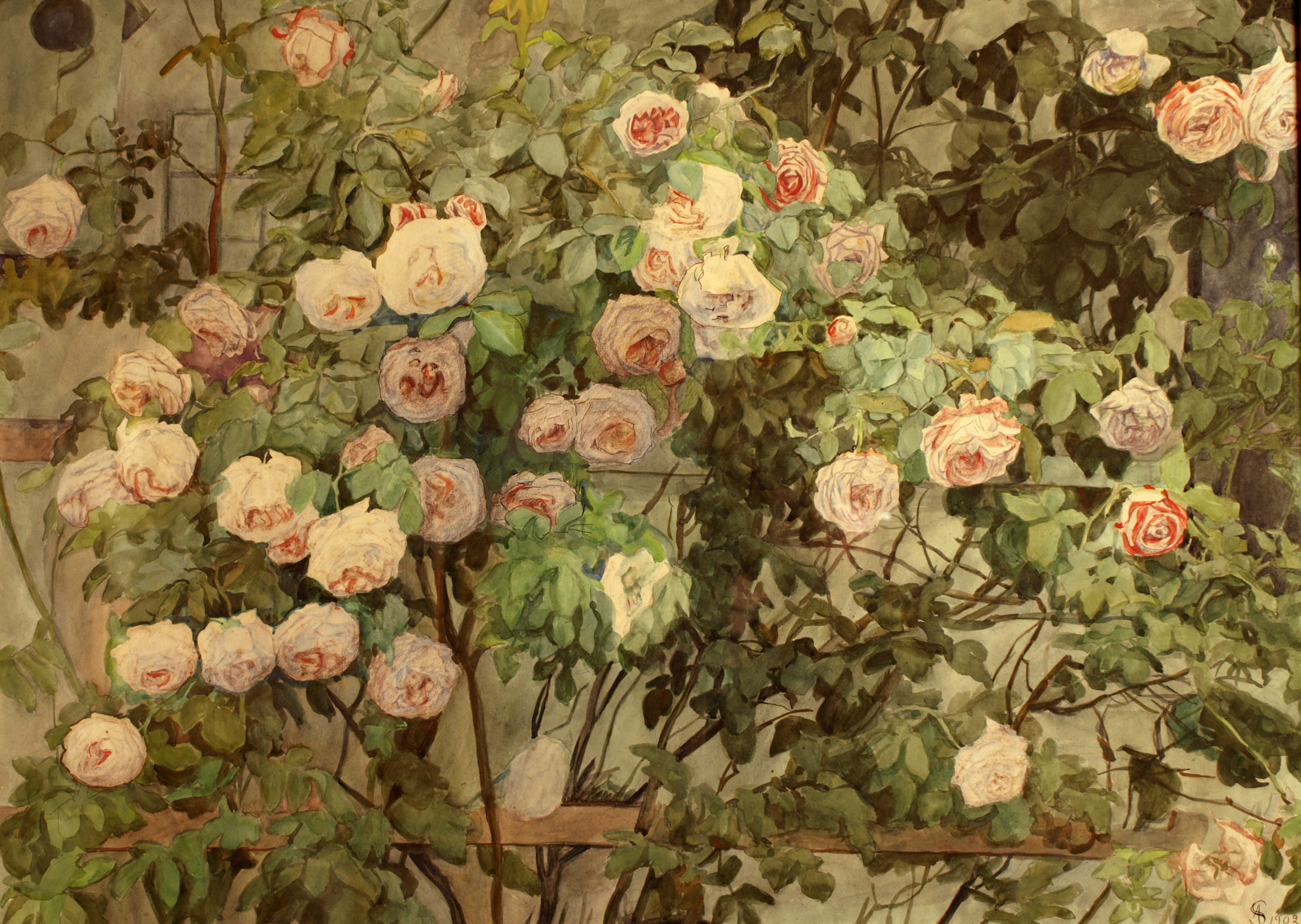
Roses, 1898

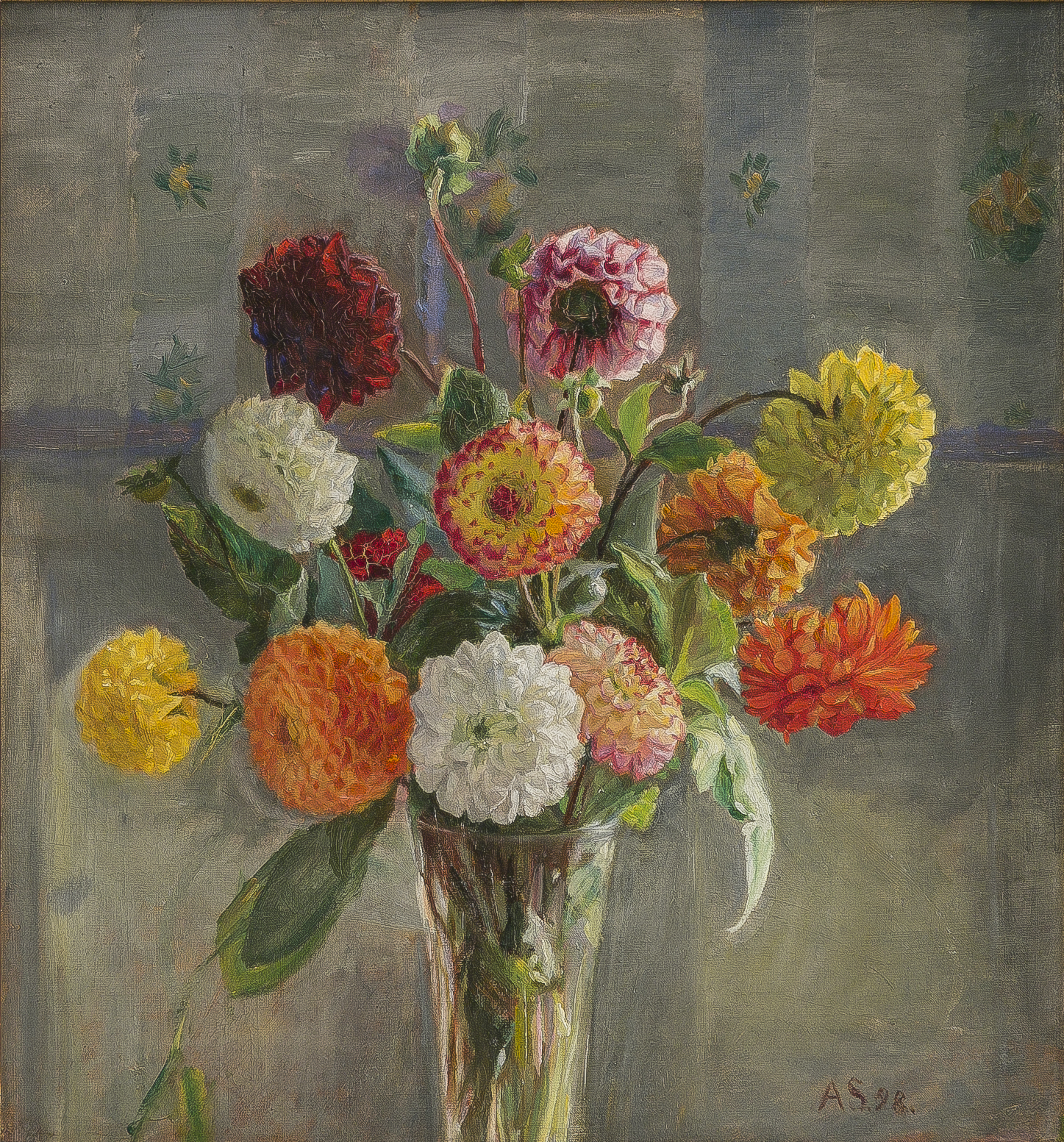
Georginer i et glas, oil on canvas, 1898

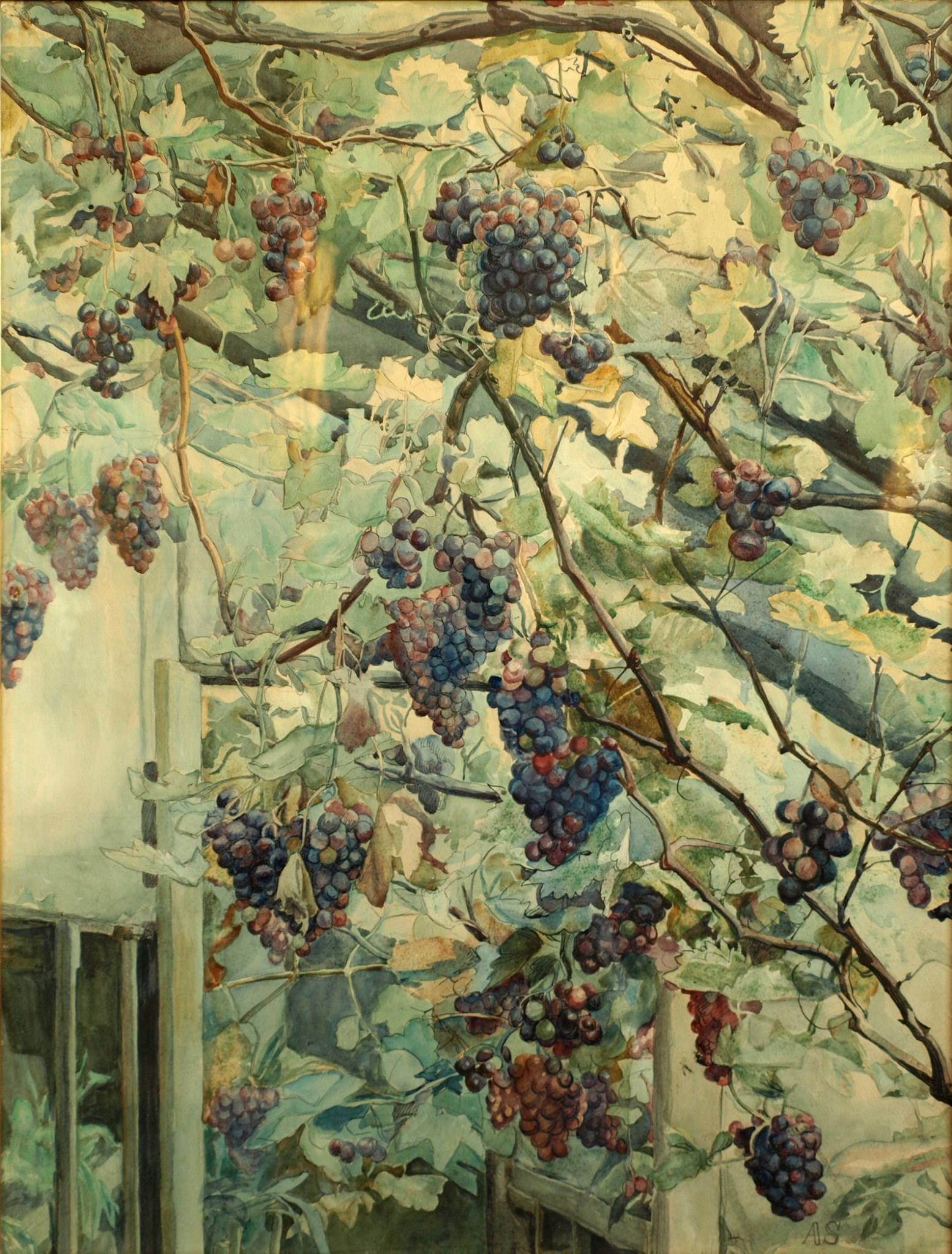
Druer i et Drivhus, oil on canvas, 1903

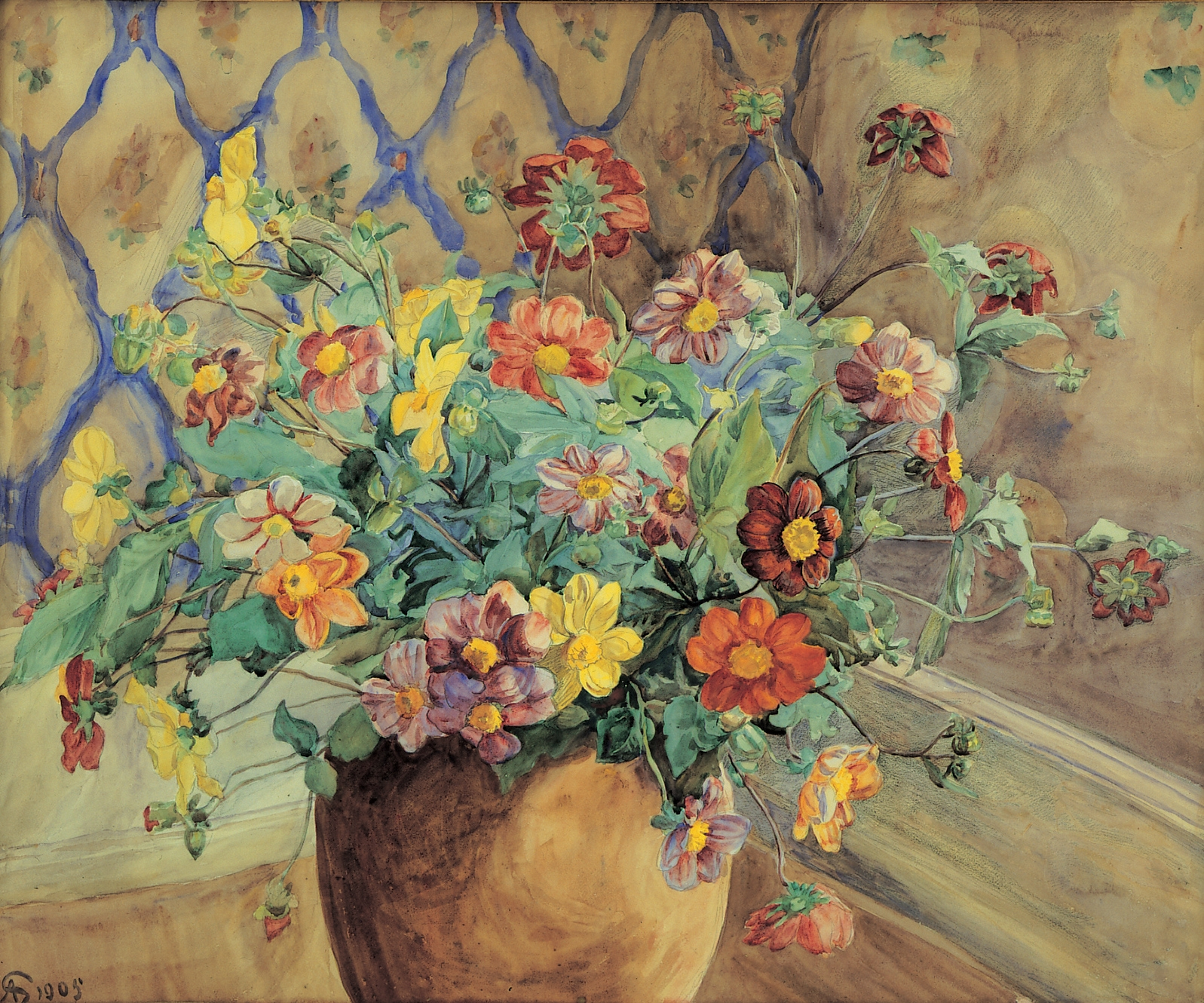
Branche de pommier en fleurs, 1905

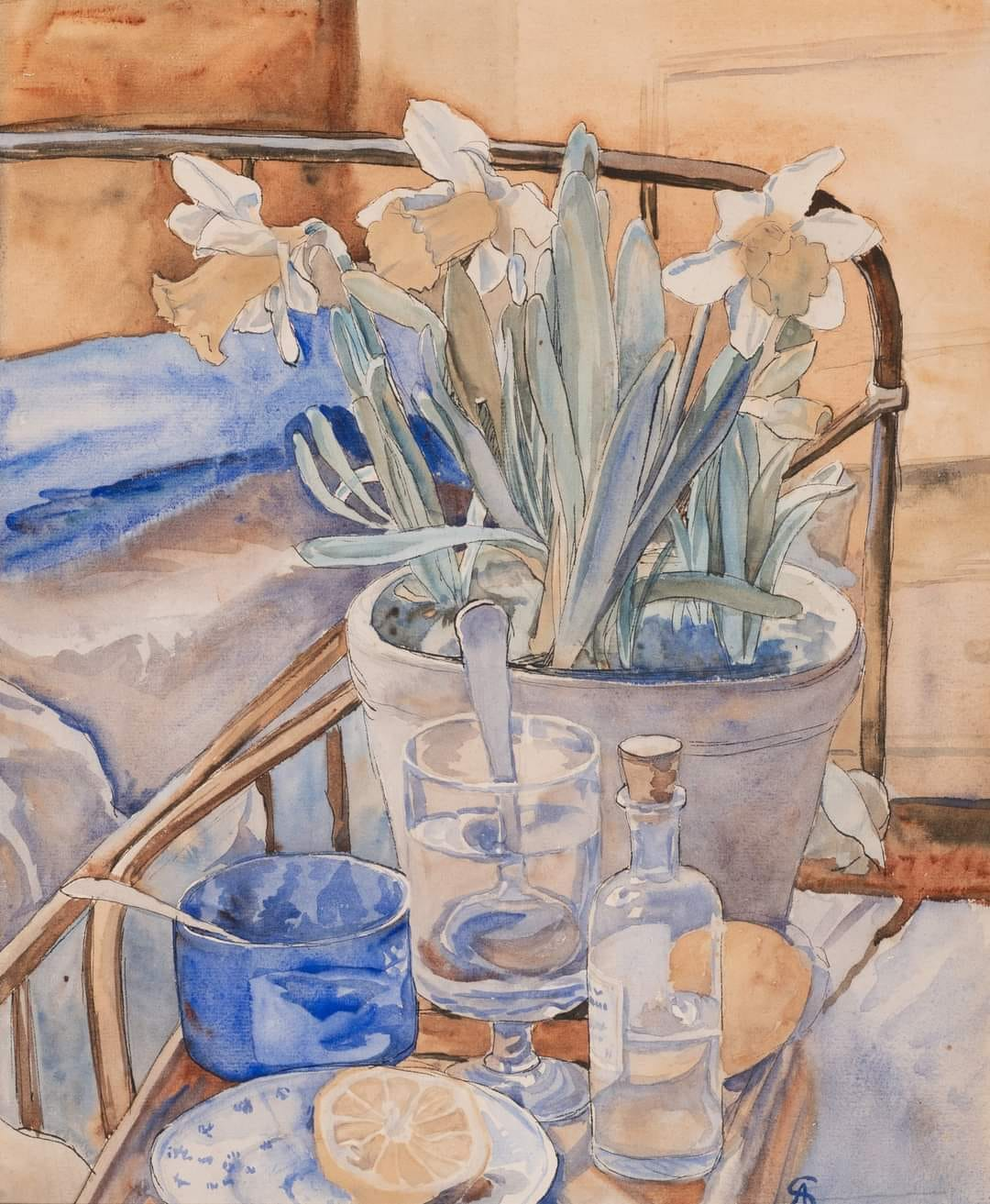
From Sick Bed, watercolor on paper, 1908
