= Hindsholm =

Coordinates: 55°31′N 10°40′E

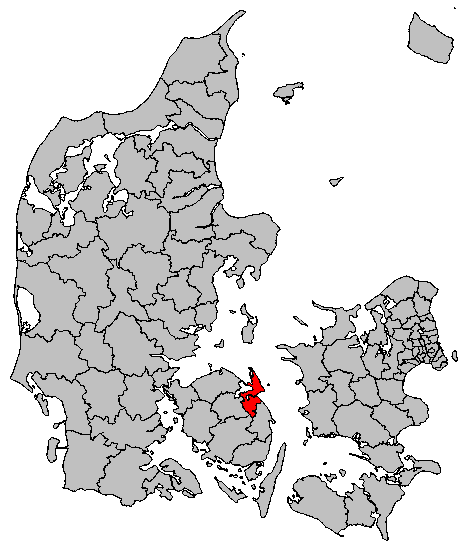
Map of Kerteminde municipality in Denmark. Hindsholm forms the northern half of this municipality.

Hindsholm is a peninsula forming the north-eastern extremity of the Danish island of Funen. It is bound to the south by the Kerteminde Fjord but linked to the rest of the island in the south-west. It belongs to Kerteminde municipality.
