= Kerteminde =

- Town
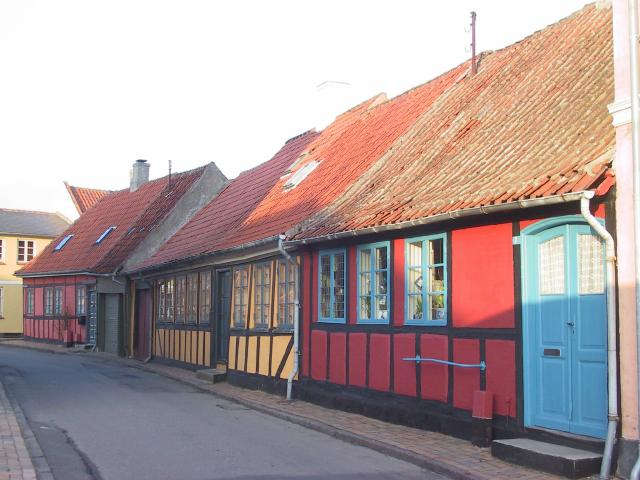
- Street with old houses in Kerteminde.

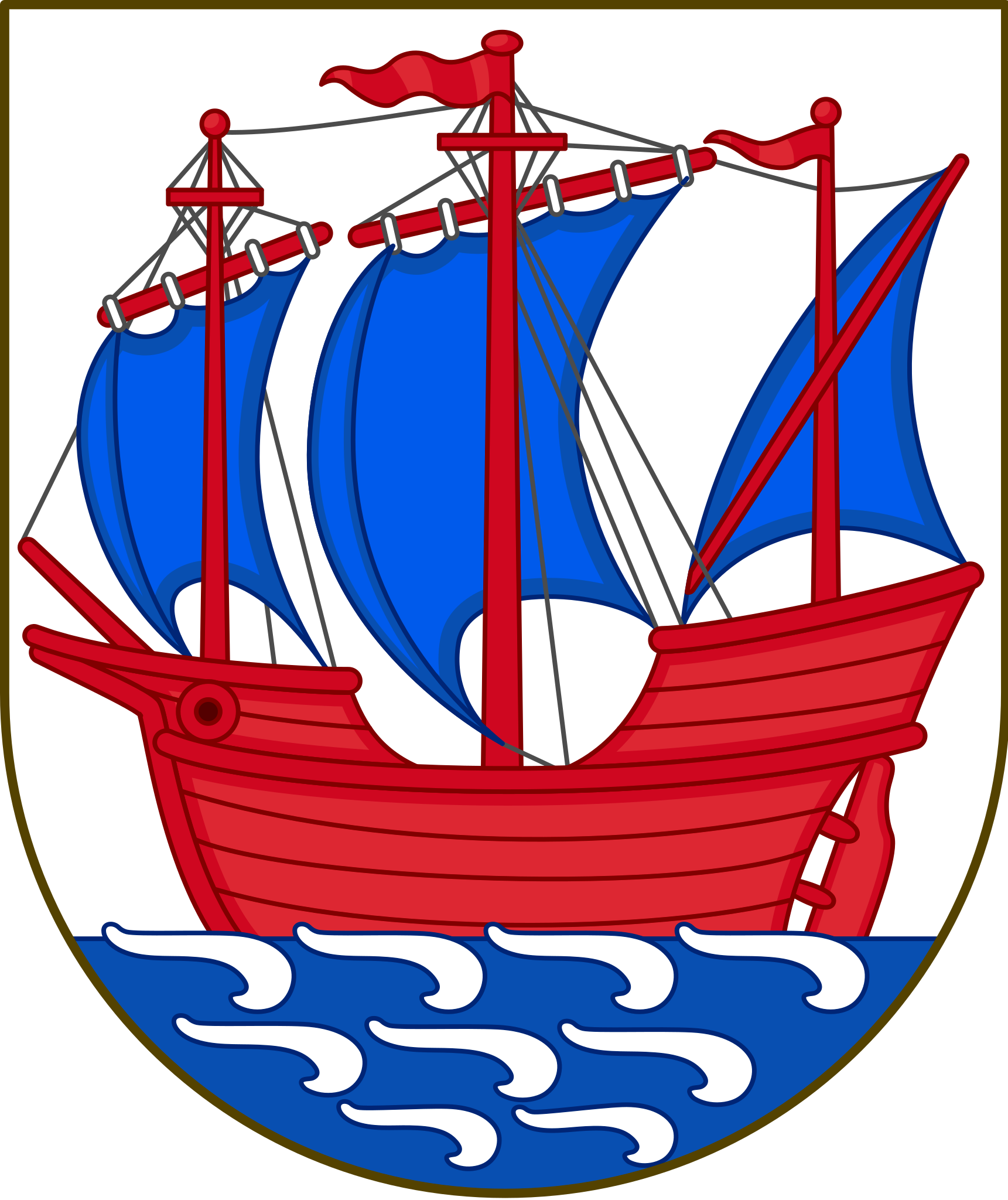
- Coat of arms
- Nickname: Kerteminde Haven ved Havet / The Garden by the Sea / Der Garten am Meer
- Location in Denmark Kerteminde (Region of Southern Denmark)
- Coordinates: 55°27′N 10°40′E
- Country: Denmark
- Region: Southern Denmark
- Municipality: Kerteminde

Area
  - Urban: 3.5 km^{2} (1.4 sq mi)

Population (2026)
  - Urban: 6,150
  - Urban density: 1,800/km^{2} (4,600/sq mi)
  - Gender: 2,827 males and 3,323 females
- Demonym: Kerteminder
- Time zone: UTC+1 (CET)
  - Summer (DST): UTC+2 (CEST)
- Postal code: DK-5300 Kerteminde

Kerteminde (nickname: Min Amandas by, i.e. My Amanda's town), is a town in central Denmark on Kerteminde Bay, located in Kerteminde Municipality on the island of Funen. The town has a population of 6,150 (1 January 2026). It is a small harbor town surrounded by farms. Kerteminde contains a fish restaurant, Rudolf Mathis, the Viking museum Ladby, the Johannes Larsen Museum, and the research and exhibition institution for fish and porpoises Fjord & Bælt.

== Parish and churches ==
Kerteminde is part of the Kerteminde-Drigstrup Parish, which was created on 1 December 2013 by merging the two parishes. Kerteminde Parish was quite small, so in the 1920s Kerteminde grew beyond the parish boundaries and gained a suburb on Over Kærby Mark in Drigstrup Parish.

Kerteminde's parish church, Sankt Laurentii Kirke, is located in the town. The town is also home to Emmauskirken, which is owned by Kerteminde-Dalby Valgmenighed, which also has Bethlehemskirken in Dalby.

== School facilities ==
Kerteminde Byskole has 466 students in grades 0-9. Kerteminde Efterskole is a Grundtvig-Kold school with 23 employees.

The town has 4 daycare centers: Balders Hus with daycare and kindergarten for 78 children, Fjordvang kindergarten for 53 children, Nymarken kindergarten for 62 children and the private daycare and kindergarten Mølleløkken for 51 children.

Kerteminde Idrætscenter consists of two sports halls at the town's stadium.

== Etymology ==
The town's name (1412 Kiertheminde, 1430 Kirtimynnæ) comes from the old name for Kerteminde Fjord, Kirta, followed by the Old Danish word minni, 'mynni 'mouth'.

== Notable people ==
=== Painters ===
- Frederik Storch (1805 in Kerteminde – 1883) a Danish genre painter
- Johannes Larsen (1867 in Kerteminde – 1961) a nature painter, one of the Funen Painters
- Anna Syberg (1870–1914) a Funen painter, lived in Pilegården near Kerteminde from 1902
- Christine Swane (1876 in Kerteminde – 1960) one of the Funen Painters then developed a Cubist style
- Axel P. Jensen (1885 in Kerteminde – 1972) a painter of landscapes with stronger colouring than the Funen Painters
- Alfred Simonsen (1906 in Kølstrup, near Kerteminde – 1935) a painter, one of the Odsherred Painters
- Ernst Syberg (1906 in Kerteminde – 1981) a painter, became one of the Odsherred Painters
- Birthe Bovin (1906 in Kerteminde – 1980) a self-taught Danish painter, became one of Odsherred Painters

=== Other arts ===
- Frederik Paludan-Müller (1809 in Kerteminde – 1876) a Danish poet
- Arent Nicolai Dragsted (1821 in Kerteminde – 1898) a Danish goldsmith
- Franz Syberg (1904 in Kerteminde - 1955) a composer and organist at Kerteminde, 1932-1955
- Henning Ipsen (1930-1984) Danish novelist and translator
- Annette Strøyberg (1936 in Rynkeby, near Kerteminde – 2005) a Danish actress
- Thor Pedersen (traveller) (born 1978 in Kerteminde) a Danish traveller and adventurer

=== Sport ===
- Oliver Christensen (born 1999 in Kerteminde) a professional footballer
- Niels Petersen (1918 in Kerteminde – 1966) a weightlifter, competed at the 1948 Summer Olympics
- Jan Eli Andersen (born 1966 in Kerteminde) a sailor, competed at the 1996 Summer Olympics
- Niclas Vemmelund (born 1992 in Kerteminde) a Danish football defender
- Kristoffer Lund (born 1999 in Kerteminde) a professional footballer

== International relations ==
=== Twin towns and sister cities ===
Kerteminde is twinned with:

- Forsand, Norway
- Loksa, Estonia
- Lempäälä, Finland
- North Berwick, United Kingdom
- Øvre Eiker, Norway
- Rožnov pod Radhoštěm, Czech Republic
- Schwentinental, Germany
- Ulricehamn, Sweden

== See also ==
- Korshavn, Denmark
