= Bent Helweg-Møller =

Danish architect (1883–1956)

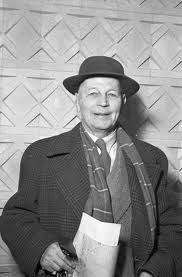
Bent Helweg-Møller

Bent Helweg-Møller (8 June 1883 – 8 February 1956) was a Danish architect. His works include the listed Villa Vendle in Tisvilde (1911) and Svane Apotek (1934) in Copenhagen as well as the Berlingske Building in Copenhagen and an extension of Odense City Hall in Odense. He has also renovated a number of historic properties, including the Niels Brock House and Heering House on Christianshavn and Klostergården on Amagertorv in Copenhagen.

== Early life and education ==
Helweg-Møller was born on 8 June 1773 in Odense, the son of later savings bank manager Hans Jakob Møller and Anna Sophie née Helweg. He matriculated from Odense Technical School and completed a mason's apprenticeship in 1903. He studied attended the Royal Danish Academy of Fine Arts from 1904 to 1908 and worked at Anton Rosen architectural firm from 1906 to 1909.

== Career ==
Helweg-Møller established his own architectural firm in 1910. Some of his earliest works were large villas and renovations of historical buildings. In the late 1920s and early 1930s, he turned to the new Functionalist but often combined it with Art Deco elements and an unusual attention to detail.

He served as architect for Berlingske Media, expanding the company's head office in Pilestræde (1928–30, later altered). He received a number of high-profile commissions from companies such as Berlingske, Magasin du Nord and A. C. Bang. In 1933, he won the first prize in the competition for an extension of Odense City Hall.

He was a member of Akademirådet in 1933–43 and again in 1946.

== Porcelain and furniture ==
In 1910–14, Helweg-Møller worked for the Royal Porcelain Factory. His designs for the company included a series of memorial plates with architectural motifs.

== Exhibition architect ==
Danish pavilion at the World Expo in Rio de Janeiro (1922)

Royal Copenhagen pavilion at the International Exhibition of Modern Decorative and Industrial Arts in Paris (1925)

== Selected works ==
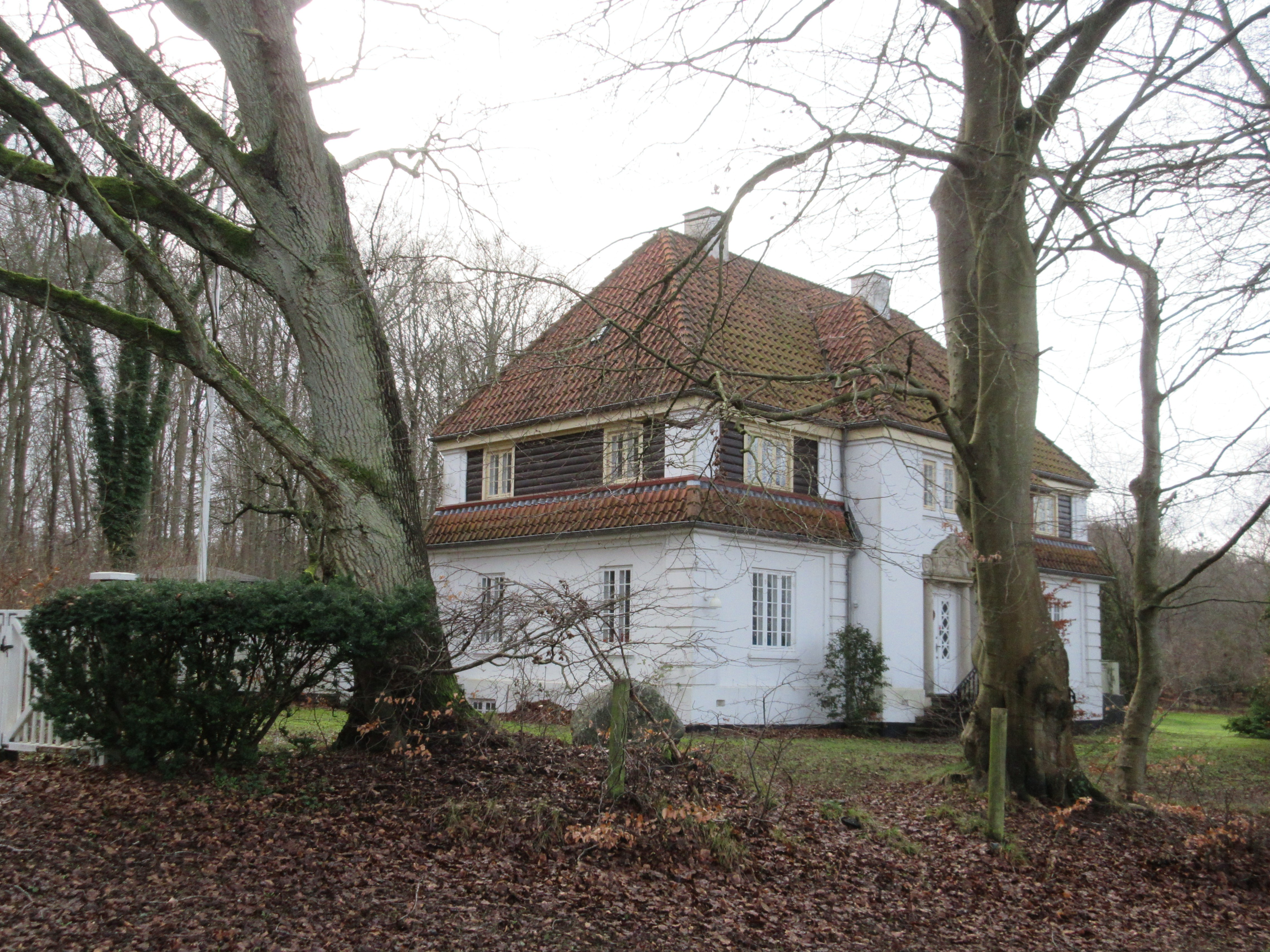
Villa Vendle, Tisvilde (1911)

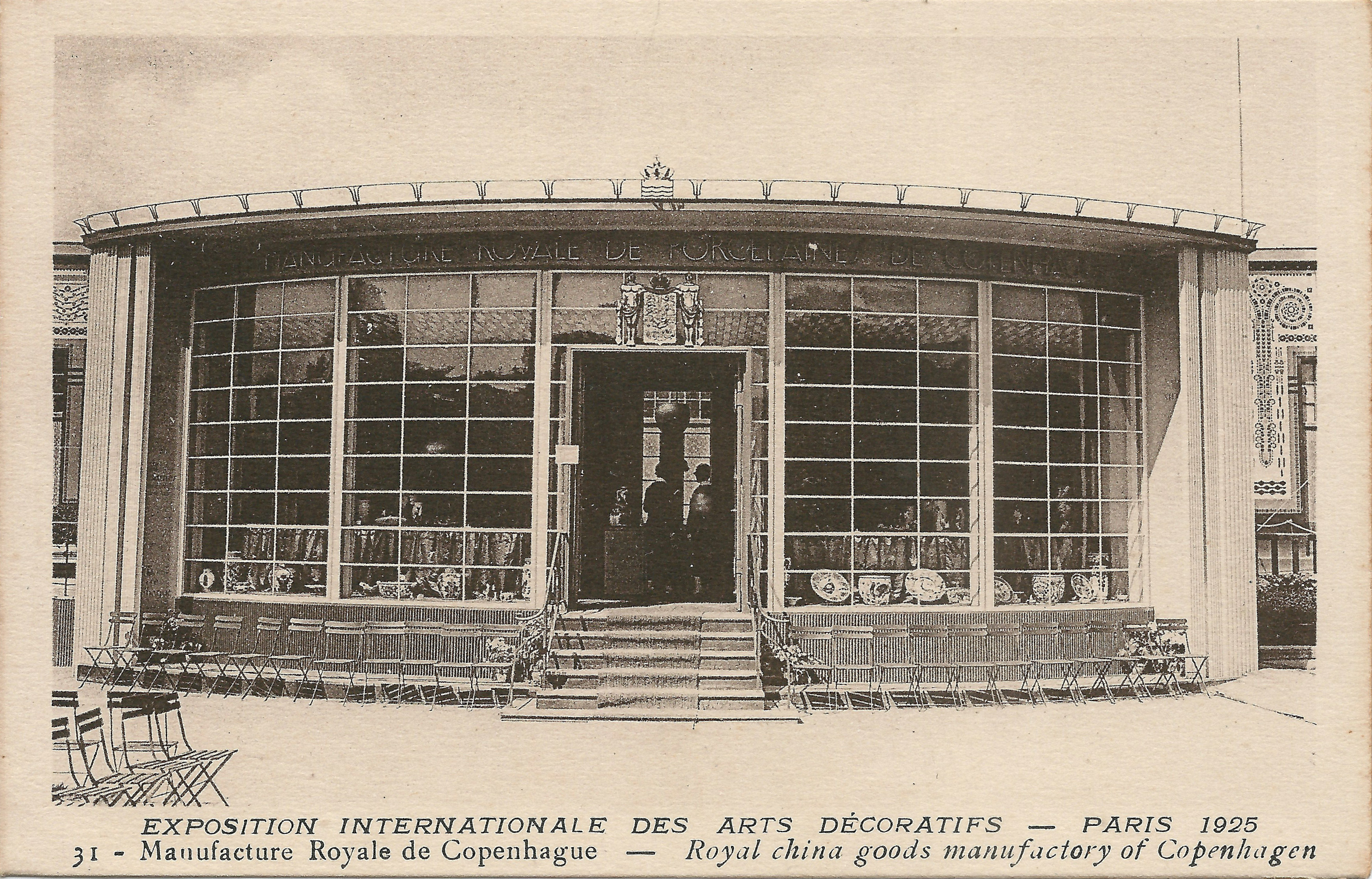
Royal Copenhagen pavilion at the International Exhibition of Modern Decorative and Industrial Arts in Paris (1925)

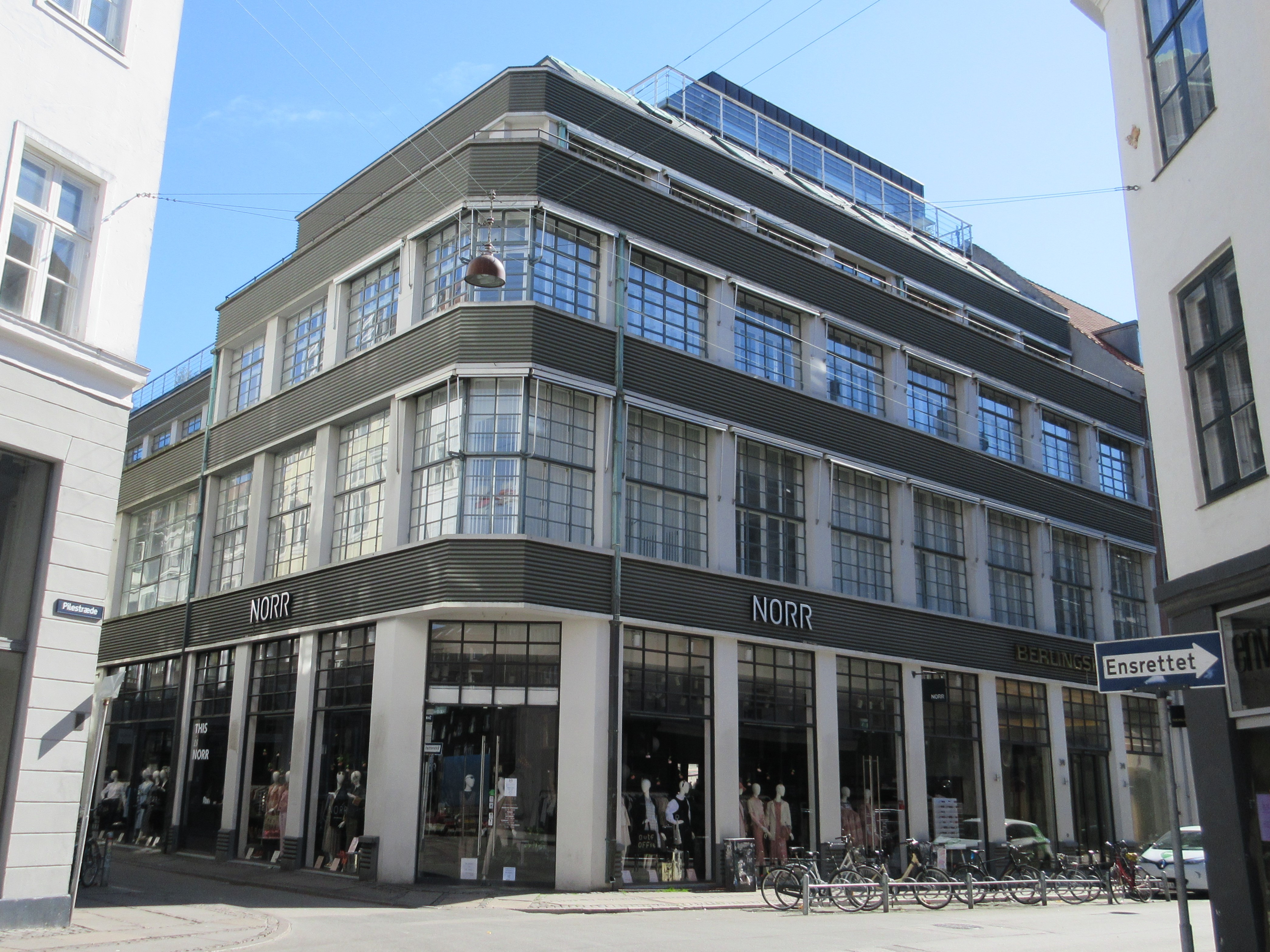
Berlingske Building, Copenhagen (1930)

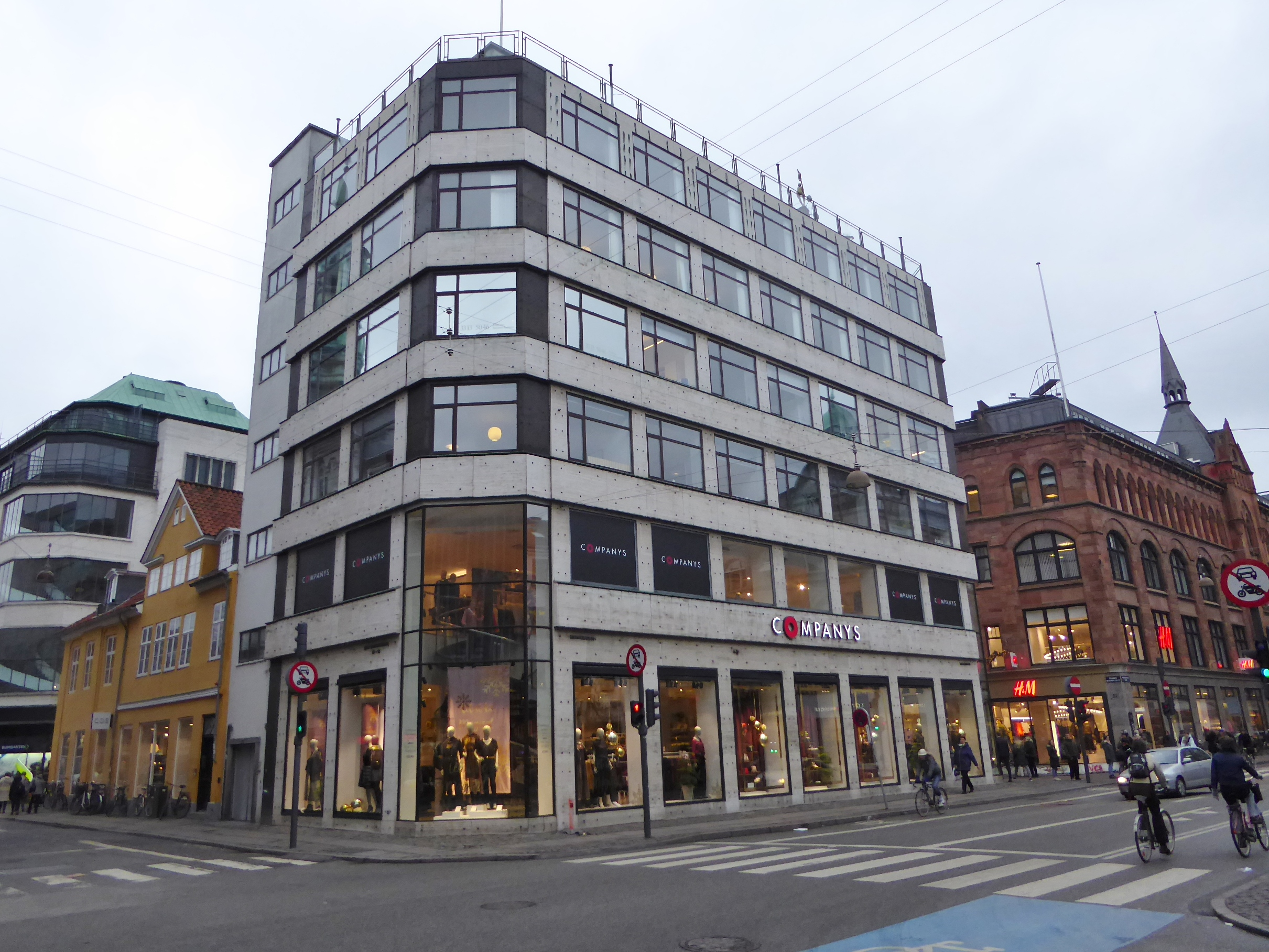
A. C. Bang, Copenhagen (1934)

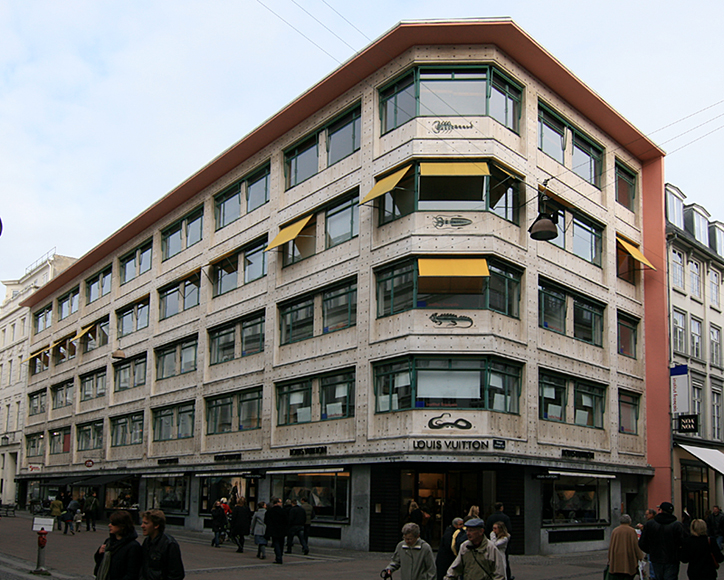
Svane Apotek, Copenhagen (1934)

- Vejby Church, Vejby (1910)
- Holmehuset, Ved Gærdet 11, Tisvildeleje (1910)
- Extension of Fyens Stifts Sparekasse, Odense (1910–11)
- Villa Vendle, Ved Gærdet 1, Tisvildeleje (1912, listed 2015)
- Restoration of Niels Brock House, Strandgade 36, Copenhagen (1915–17, award 1919)
- Apartment building, Klaregade 19, Odense (1916)
- Hellesens Fabrikker, Hammershusgade, Copenhagen (1918, partly demolished)
- Høveltegård, Høvelte (1919)
- Interiors for Royal Copenhagen, Amagertorv 6, Copenhagen (1922, dismantled and sold in 2007)
- Renovation of Klostergården, Amagertorv 29, Copenhagen (1922, award 1923)
- Villa, Holmevej 10, Holte (1923)
- Renovation of Metropol/B.T. Central, Rådhuspladsen 55, Copenhagen (1924 and 1929)
- Villa, Einar Holbølls Vej, Charlottenlund (1925)
- Royal Copenhagen pavilion at the International Exhibition of Modern Decorative and Industrial Arts in Paris (1925, demolished)
- Renovation of the Heering House, Overgaden neden Vandet 11, Copenhagen (1923–27, award in 1929)
- Villa, Rosavej 4, Ordrup (1927–28, later altered)
- General Motors Building, Aldersrogade 20, Copenhagen (1927)
- Berlingske Tidendes Hus, Pilestræde 32-34 (1928–30, with Nøkkentved & Friis Jespersen, award in 1931, altered in 1990-91 and 2007–09)
- Apartment building, Torvegade/Overgaden neden Vandet, Copenhagen (1931–32)
- A. C. Bang, Østergade 27, Copenhagen (1932–34, altered in 1990)
- Renovation of Magasin du Nord, Copenhagen (1932, with Emanuel Monberg, demolished and replaced by new building by Eruk Møller)
- Forsikringsselskabet Nye Danske, Aalborg (1934)
- Svane Apotek, Østergade 18, Copenhagen (1934, with Nøkkentved & Friis Jespersen, listed in 1995)
- Hansa Building, Vesterbrogade 10, Copenhagen (1935)
- A.B. Gillblads Varuhus, Gothenburg, Sweden (1935)
- Bernstorffshøj, Ved Slotshaven 6, 2820 Gentofte (1936)
- I-G-Varehuset, Vestergade 18, Odense (1936, later altered)
- Houses on the Blangstedgård estate, Hunderupvej, Odense (1930s)
- Apartment block, for AAB, Blegdamsvej/Irmingergade, Copenhagen (1935–37, award 1938, windows and balconies altered)
- Villa, Solbakkevej 23, Gentofte (1940)
- Danmarks Nationalbank Building, Aalborg (1940–43)
- Renovation and extension of Odense City Hall, Odense (1939–55)
- H. C. Andersens Have (Eventyrhaven), Odense City Hall, Odense (1942–43, with C.Th. Sørensen and Poul Wad, altered in 2020)*

Mosegårdsskolen, Stolpehøj 150, Vangede (1947–50)

- A/S Lastic, Lersø Parkallé 108, Copenhagen (1956, with Børge Rammeskow)
- Interiors for Nye Danske, Stormgade 2-4, Copenhagen
- Dansk Kautionsforsikring, Gammeltorv 14, Copenhagen
