= Villa Vendle =

House in Tisvildeleje, Denmark

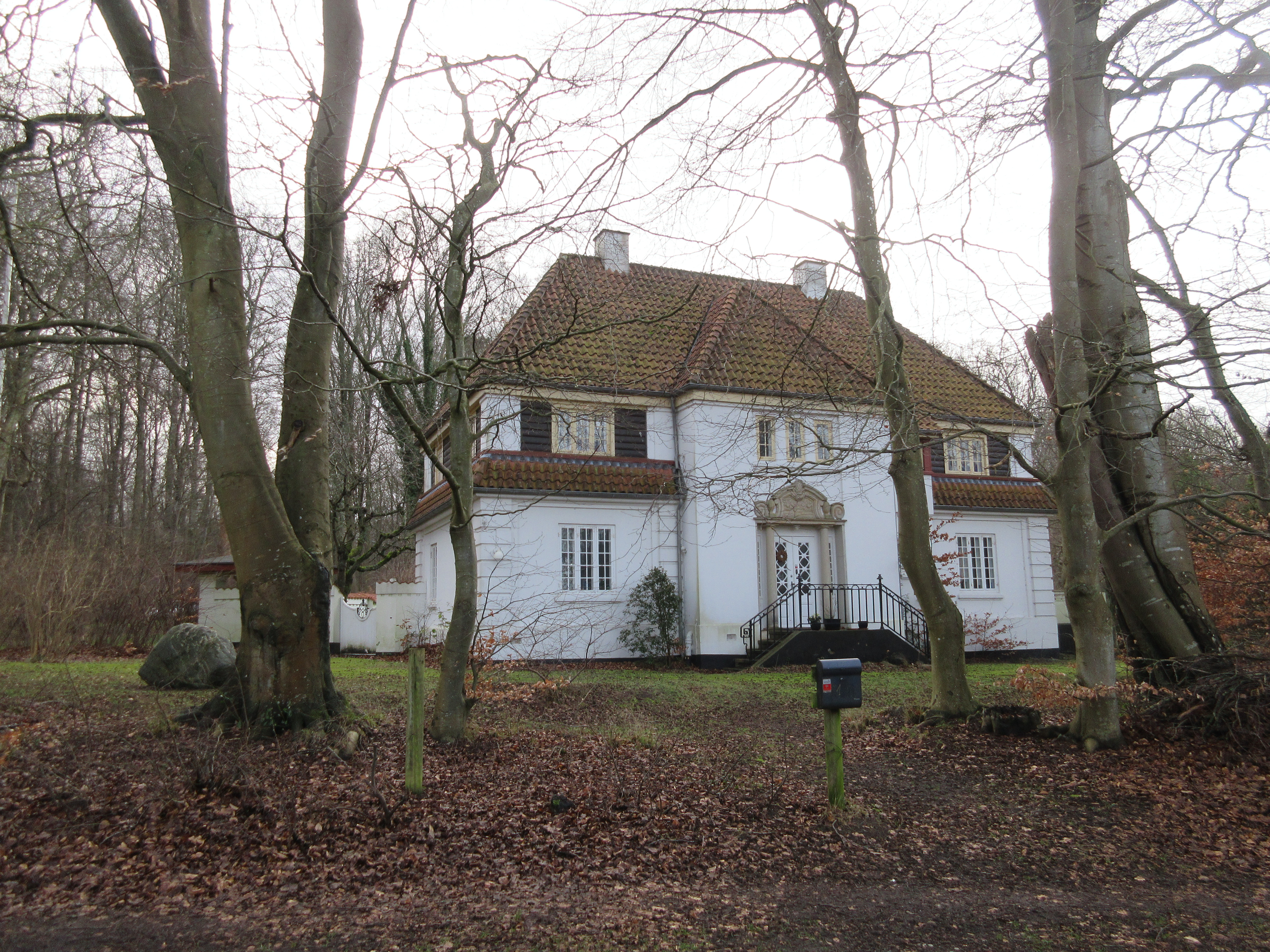
- Interactive map of the Villa Vendle area

General information
- Location: Tisvildeleje, Denmark
- Coordinates: 56°03′17.8″N 12°05′10.7″E
- Completed: 1912

Design and construction
- Architect: Bent Helweg-Møller

Villa Vendle is a country house in Tisvildeleje, Gribskov Municipality, some 50 kilometres northwest of Copenhagen, Denmark. Built for a retired eye surgeon in 1912 from a design by the architect Bent Helweg-Møller, the house is a typical and well-preserved example of the large summer residences which were built in the area for members of the upper middle-class in the 1910s. It was listed in the Danish registry of protected buildings and places in 2015. The garden borders on Hilkers Krog, part of Tisvilde Hegn.

== History ==
=== Lorentzen family, 1912-1966 ===
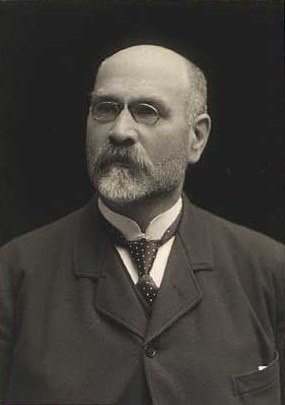
Lorentz Lorentzen

Lorentz Lorentzen was a successful eye surgeon from Aalborg. His wife, Cathrine Lorentzen, née Ahlmann, inherited the estate Langholt in Vendsyssel when her mother died in 1908. The couple moved to Copenhagen after Lorentzen's retirement where they lived in an apartment at Malmøgade 5 in Østerbro. They bought two empty lots in Tisvildeleje with a combined area of 9.000 square ells for DKK 6,000. . Villa Vendle was completed on the site later that same year. The name was a concentration of the name Vendsyssel as a manifestation of their attachment to the region.

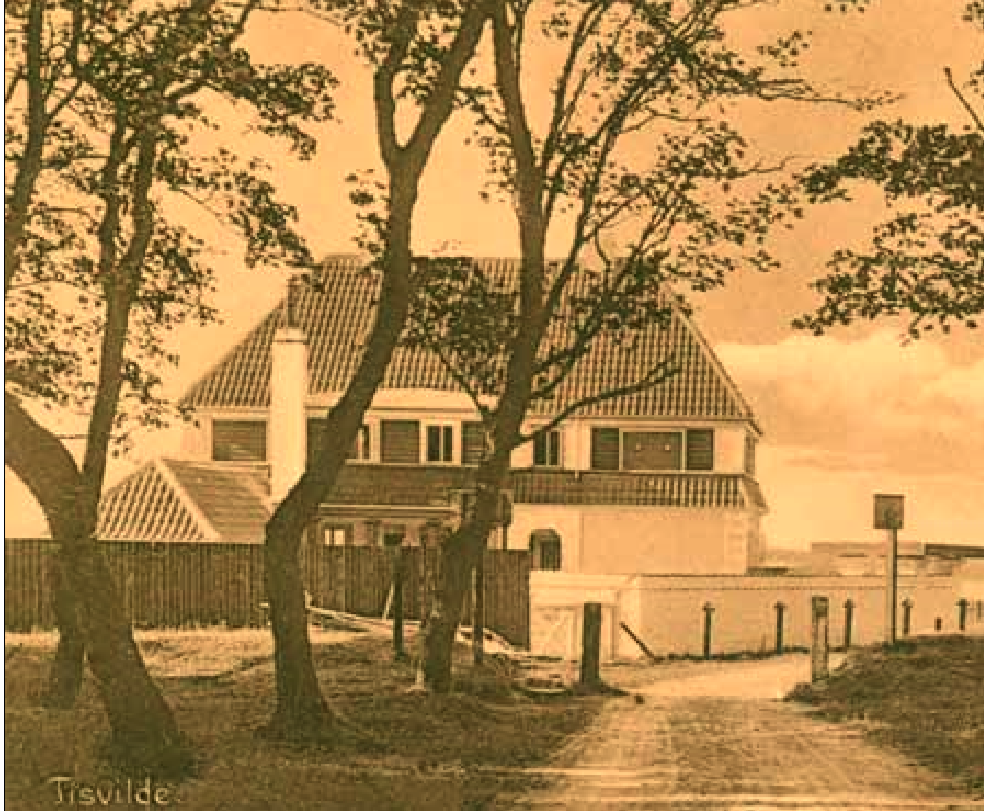
Villa Vendle seen from the entrance to the forest

Lorenzen died in 1915 and his wife just two years later. Their two daughters, Johanne Cathrine Ahlmann Steffensen and kammerherreinde Ottilie Frederikke Ahlmann Haarløv, became the joined owners of the house in Tisvildeleje. Their brother, Niels Peter Ahlmann-Lorentzen, took over the estate in North Jutland.

Ottilie Frederikke Ahlmann Haarløv was married to Viggo Rothe Haarløv, amtmann of Haderslev, who died in 1931. The house was sold when Ottilie Frederikke Ahlmann Haarløv died as the last of the two sisters in 1966.

=== Cordes family, 1966-present ===
The new owners were Hans Christian and Merete Cordes. Hans Christian Cordes, an economist, was CEO of Louis Poulsen from 1976 to 1996. Merete Cordes established her own law firm in 1972. Merete Cordes received Villa Venle when the couple divorced in 1996.

== Architecture ==
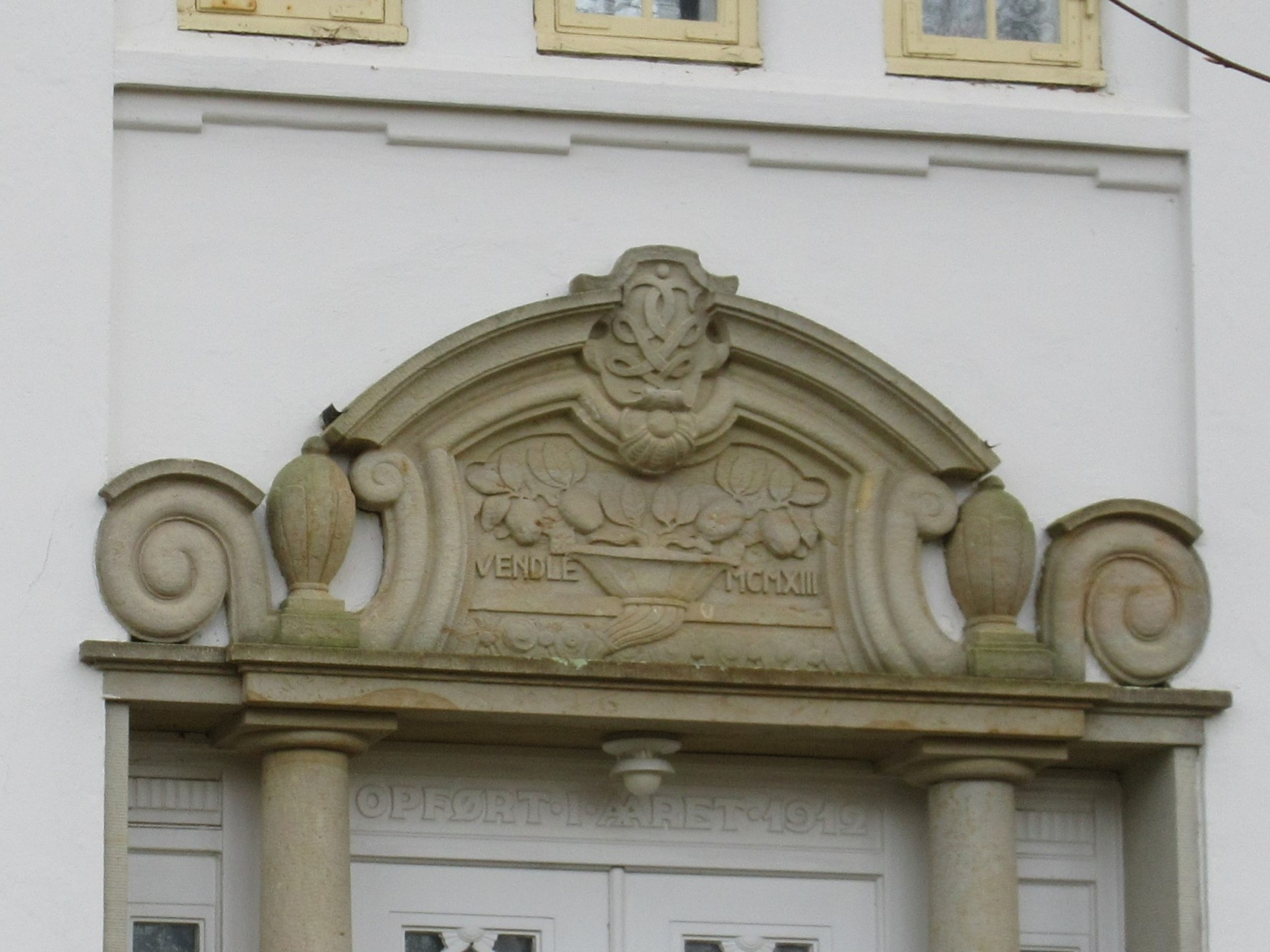
The sandstone relief above the main entrance.

The house is white with a red tile roof. The main entrance is flanked by two columns and above the door is a sandstone relief with the first owners' monogram. A one-storey outbuilding with a tall chimney extends from the rear side of the building.

Villa Vendle was listed in the Danish registry of protected buildings and places in 2+15.
