= Niels Brock =

Danish merchant (1731–1802)

Niels Brock Jr.
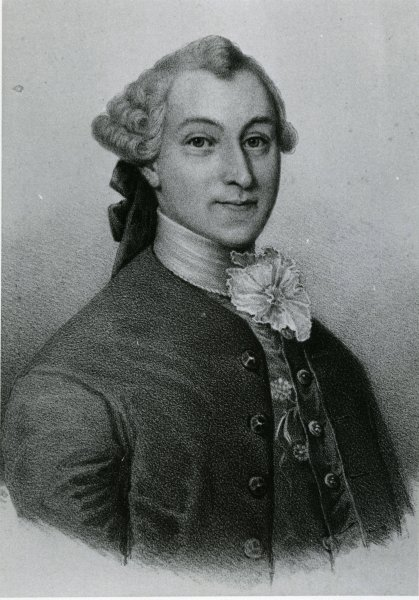
- Engraving based on painting in Randers Town Hall
- Born: 19 March 1731; Randers, Denmark
- Died: 4 October 1802 (aged 71); Copenhagen, Denmark
- Occupation: Merchant
- Known for: Niels Brock Copenhagen Business College

Niels Brock (19 March 1731 – 4 October 1802) was a Danish man. He funded the establishment of the first business school in Copenhagen, which is now named Niels Brock Copenhagen Business College after him. The Niels Brock House, his former home on Strandgade in Copenhagen, is a listed building.

== Career ==
Niels Brock was born to a merchant father in Randers in 1731. After a two-year stay at a merchant school in Lübeck, he was employed in his uncle's office in Copenhagen. Prompted by his father's death in 1754, he went back to Randers to settle his father's affairs but returned to Copenhagen in 1756 where he established a successful business with trade in linen and groceries. He traded within Denmark–Norway and with the Russian Empire (what today is Poland, Russia, Estonia, Latvia and Lithuania). He was also active as a broker and in insurance.

Niels Brock was appointed to the Council of 32 Men by the king.

== Personal life ==
In 1762, Niels Brock married Lene Bredahl, daughter of Randers mayor Nicolai Krag Bredahl. Lene Brock died in 1786 and the couple had no children. He constructed the Niels Brock House at 36 Strandgade in the Christianshavn neighbourhood of Copenhagen in 1780 and lived there until his death in 1802.

== Legacy ==
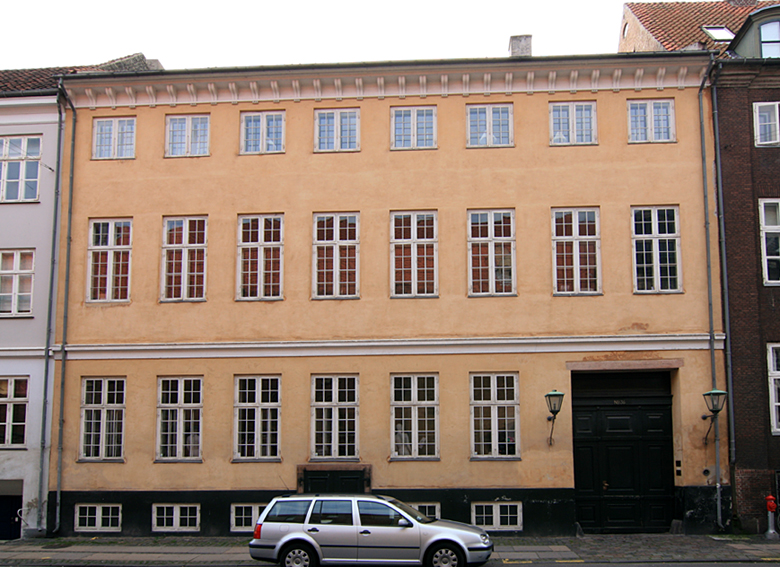
Niels Brock House in Christianshavn, Copenhagen

At the event of his death in 1802, Niels Brock left an estate of 865,000 kurantdaler which was used for grants in Randers and Copenhagen. Grosserer-Societetet, a wholesaler organization, also received a sum for the establishment of a merchant school. This was done under the auspices of the Association for the Education of Young Merchants (Foreningen til Unge Handelsmænds Uddannelse realiserede) in 1881 under the name Købmandsskolen i København. Carl Frederik Tietgen, who was a member of the board of the foundation that administrated Brock's heritage, founded an advanced school of merchantry under the name De Brockske Handelsskoler in 1888. The two schools were merged under the name Købmandsskolen in 1908. In 1991, it changed its name to Niels Brock Copenhagen Business College.
