= Bremerholm (street) =

Street in Copenhagen, Denmark

Åbenrå
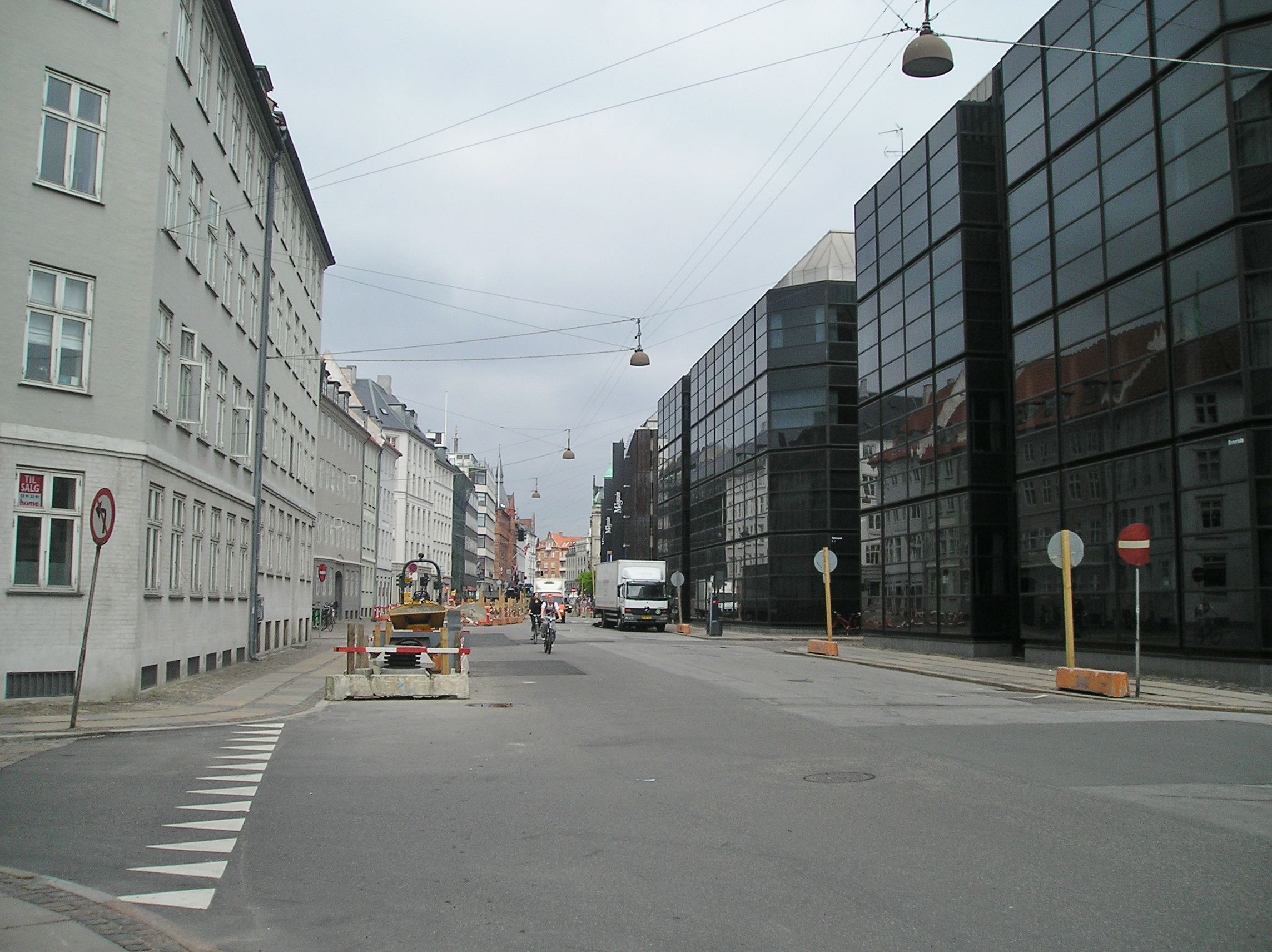
- The street Bremerholm
- Length: 289 m (948 ft)
- Location: Indre By, Copenhagen, Denmark
- Postal code: 1069
- Coordinates: 55°40′44″N 12°34′58.5″E

Bremerholm is a street in central Copenhagen, Denmark. It extends south from the major shopping street Strøget to Holmens Kanal. Together with Kristen Bernikows Gade, its extension to the north, it forms one of only two places where car traffic crosses pedestrianized Strøget on its way from Kongens Nytorv to the City Hall Square, the other being at Gammeltorv-Nytorv. The small square Magasins Torv is located in front of one of the entrances to the department store Magasin du Nord at the beginning of the street

== History ==
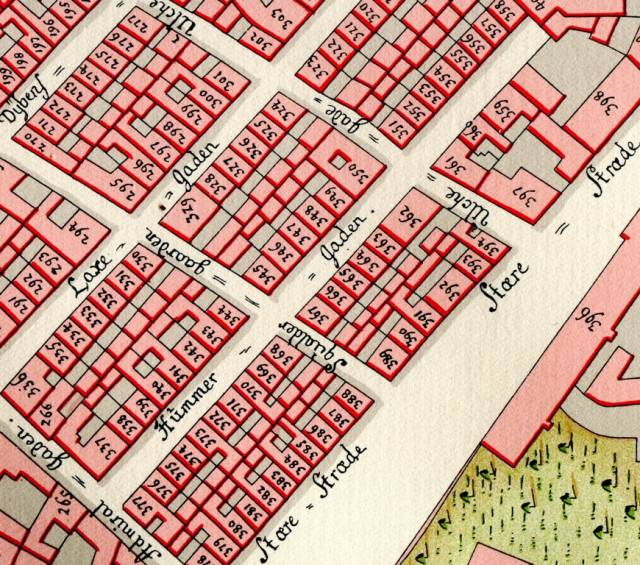
Ulkegade (Ulche Gade) and the surrounding neighbourhood seen ion Gedde's map of the East Quarter from 1757

The area where Bremerholm runs today was originally a shallow-watered area called Dybet (the Deep, the Abyss), as commemorated in the name of the intersecting street Dybensgade, which separated mainland Copenhagen from the small isle Bremerholm where a naval dockyard was established in about 1510. The area was reclaimed in the middle of the 16th century. The new area, which became part of the city's East Quarter (Østre Kvarter), was used for the construction of row houses for naval personnel. The houses were known as boder (booths) and became known as Gammelboder ("Old Booths") after Christian IV began the construction of Nyboder (New Booths).

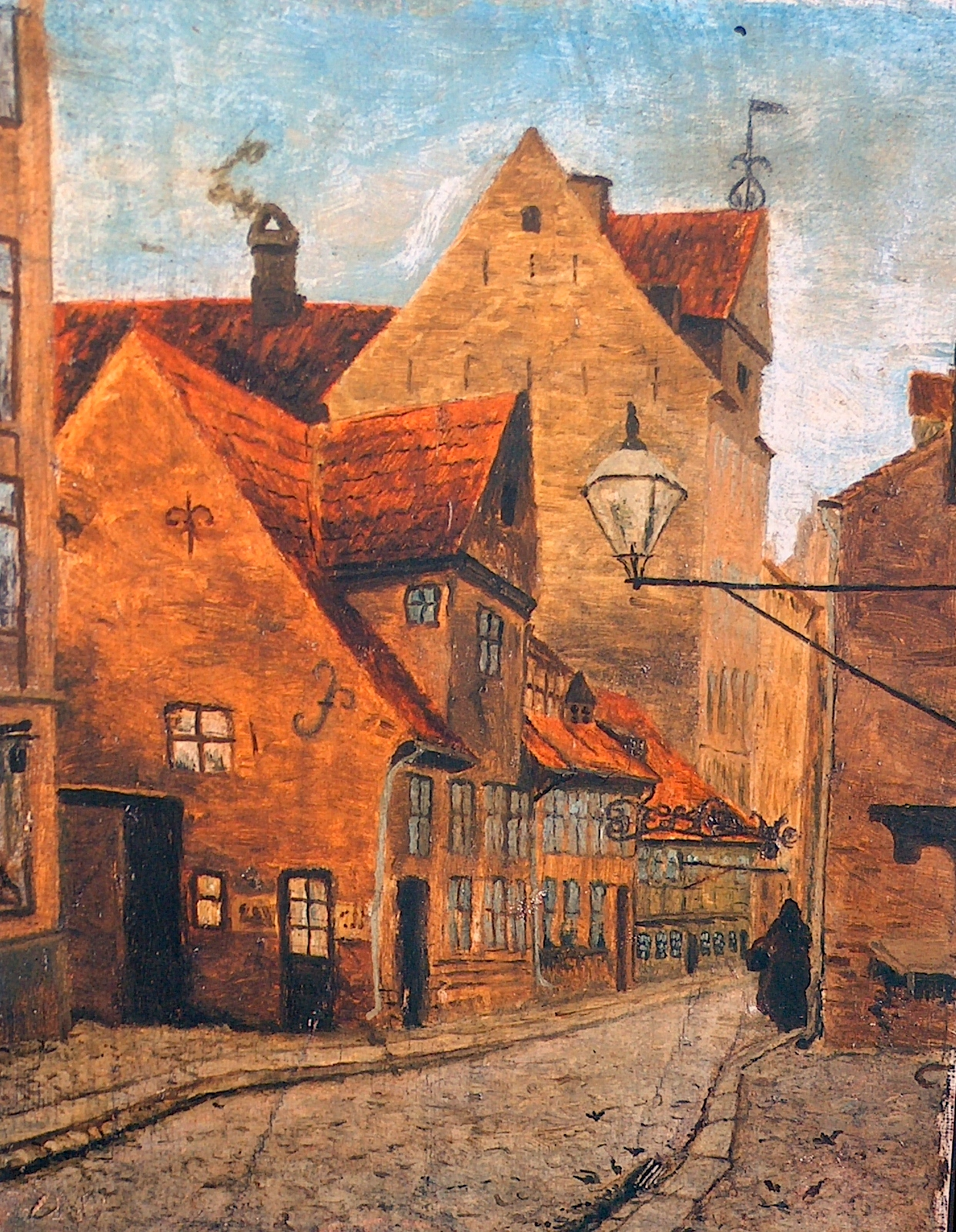
Holmensgade 8 where Hans Christian Andersen lived for a few years, painted by A. Larsen in 1884

The streets in the area were named after types of fish and shellfish. The majority of what is now known as Bremerholm was called Ulkegade (Shorthorn Sculpin Street). Other street names in the area included Laksegade ("Salmon Street"), Hummergade ("Lobster Street") and Størrestræde ("Sturgeon Lane"). Ulkegade and the surrounding neighbourhood developed an infamous reputation for prostitution and its many bars which were frequented by seamen.

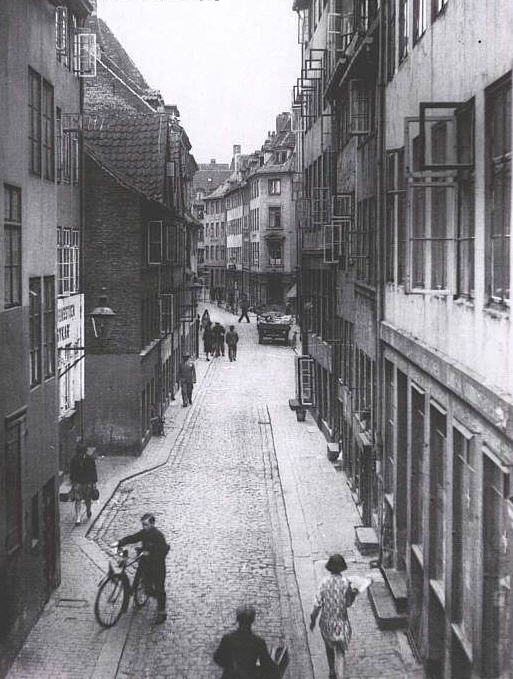
Holmensgade prior to its widening

The street was completely destroyed in the Copenhagen Fire of 1795 which began at Gammelholm and lasted for two days. It was rebuilt with Neoclassical properties but failed to obtain a better reputation and was renamed Holmensgade in 1823. The writer Hans Christian Andersen lived on the first floor at No. 8 for a couple of years.

The name Bremerholm was introduced in 1932 when Holmensgade was widened and extended from Dybensgade all the way to Østergade. The intersecting street Hummergade disappeared in 1968–71, when further redevelopment took place on the east side of the street.

== Notable buildings and residents ==
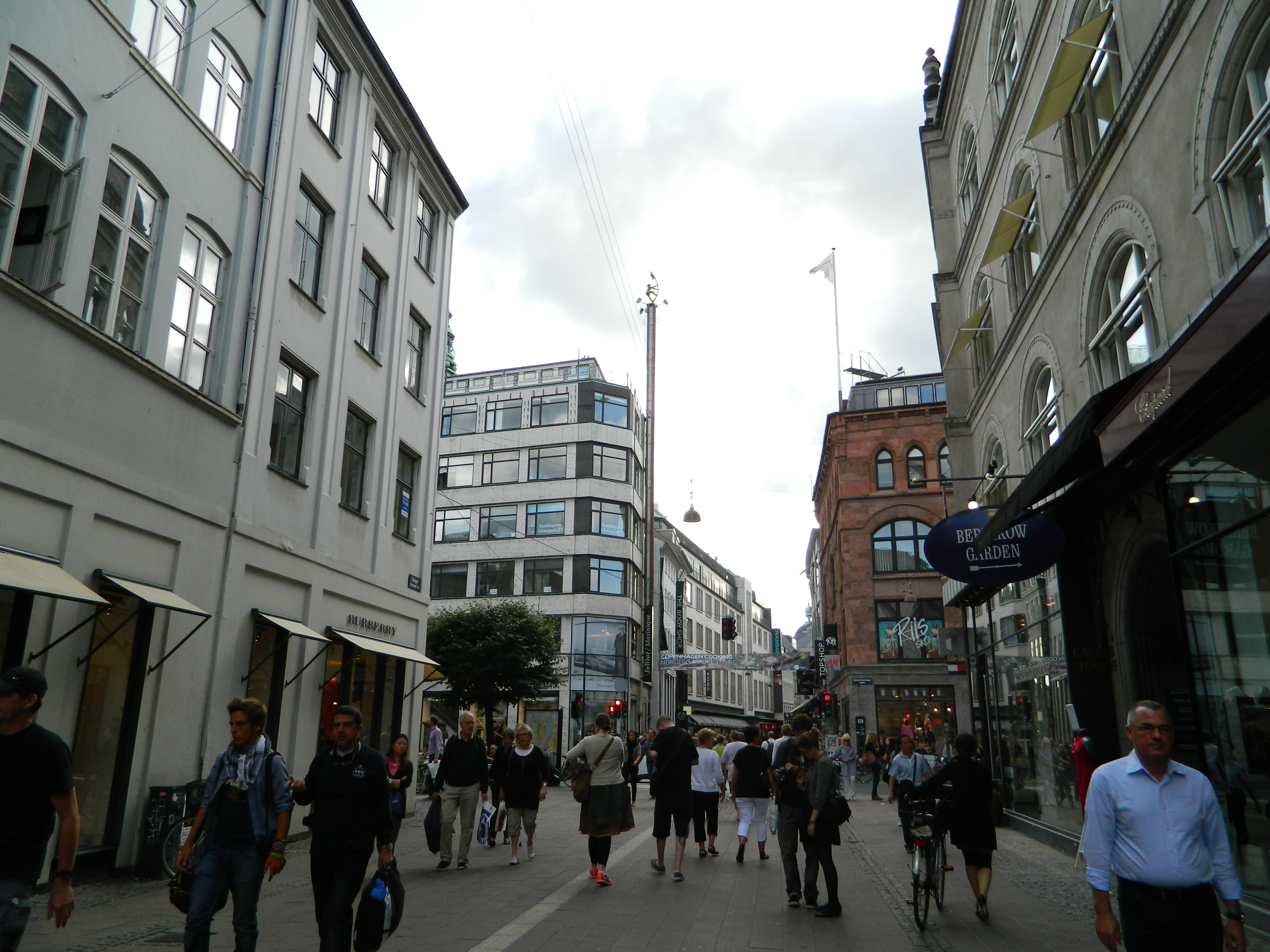
No. 2: The A.C. Bang fur house with the Diana sculpture mounted on its tall pillar

The A.C. Bang fur house (Bremerholm 2/Østergade 27/Lille Kongensgade 32), a seven-storey, modernist property on the corner with Strøget, was built for the furrier A. C. Bang in 1932–32 to design by Bent Helweg-Møller. A tall pillar with a statue of Diana trying to catch a small fur animal runs along the full height of the building and a few metres higher on the Strøget side of the building.

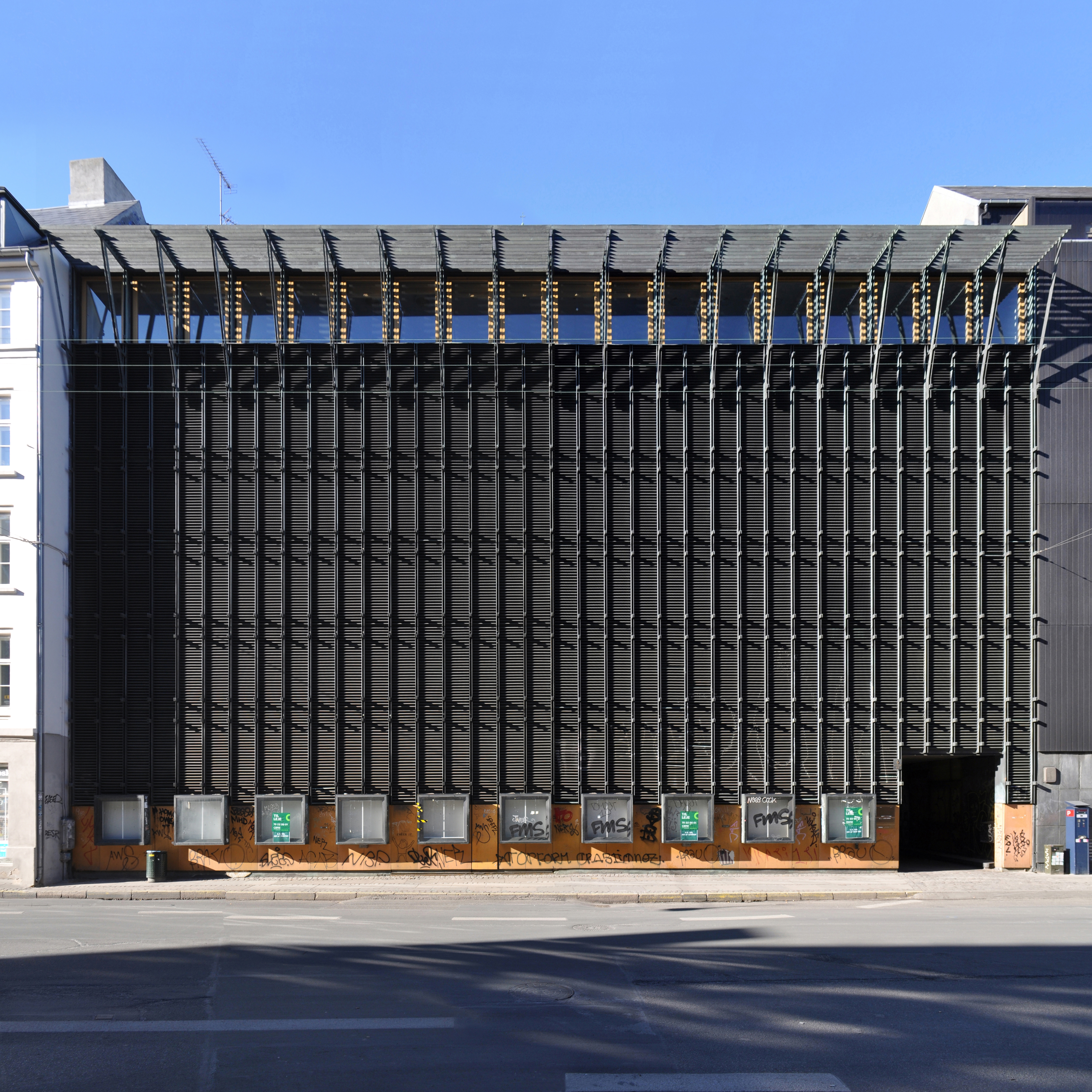
No. 6: The former transformer station

The former distribution substation at No. 6 was built in 1962–63 to design by Hans Chr. Hansen who worked at city architect F.C. Lund's office.

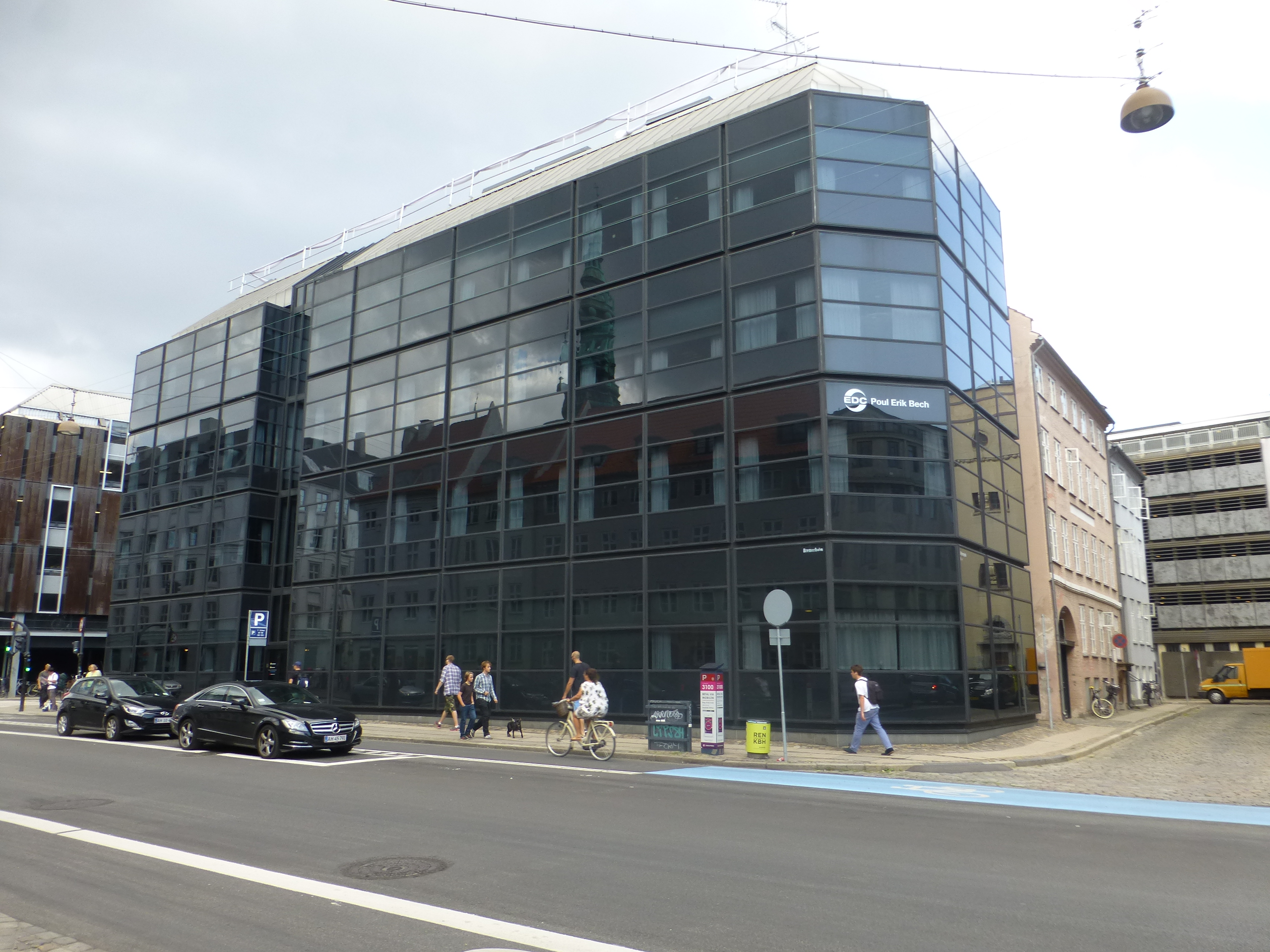
No. 31: Danske Bank building

Only four buildings have survived from the time before the 1932 expansion. No. 18 (Bremerholm 18/Vingårdstræde 18), built in 1851 to design by Peter Christoph Hagemann, was listed in 1969. No. 22 (Bremerholm 22-24/Vingårdstræde 17), No. 26 and No. 28 (Bremerholm 28 / Dybensgade 14) are all from about 1800 but neither of them are listed.

The glazed office buildings at No. 29 (Bremerholm 29/Vingårdsstræde 13/Dybensgade 6), No. 31 (Bremerholm 31/Laksegade 16/Dybensgade 7) and No. 33 were built for Danske Bank by the architects Tyge Holm and Flemming Grut in the 1970s. The rest of the buildings on that side of the street are also part of the Danske Bank headquarters. Opposite the Danske Bank complex is Overformynderiet's former building which fronts Holmens Kanal.

== Public art ==
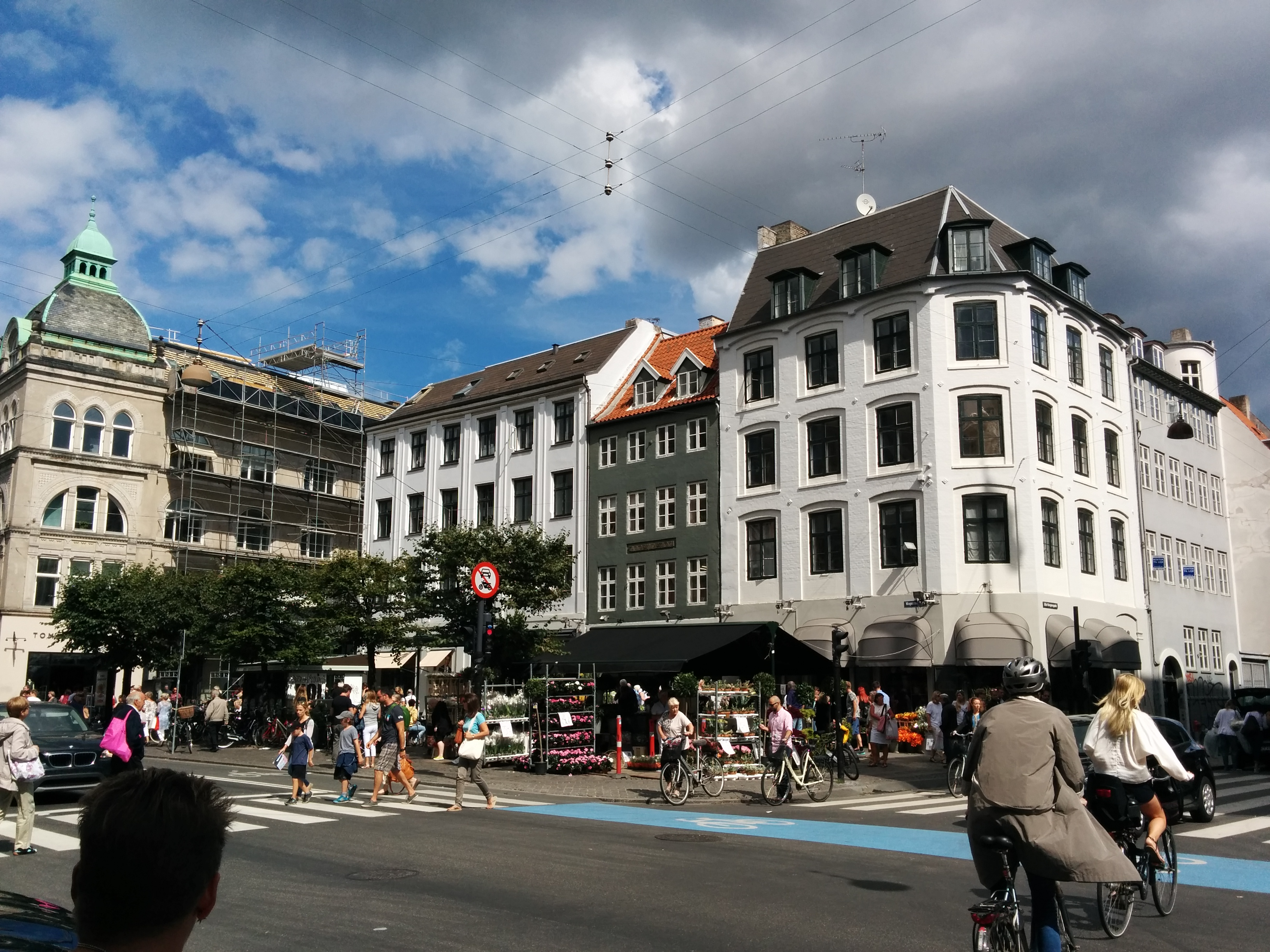
Magasins Torvstation

Magasins Torv (Magasin's Square") next to Strøget was created in 1930 when Bremerholm was widened and received its new name. It is dominated by a flower shop.

Banktorvet ("The Bank Square"), a small cul-de-sac surrounded by Danske Bank buildings, is the only surviving portion of the street Hummergade which disappeared in the 1950s. It is the site of a water feature.
