= A.C. Bang =

Coordinates: 55°40′43″N 12°34′29″E

- Type: Private
- Industry: Clothing
- Founded: 1816
- Founder: Jørgen Daniel Bang
- Headquarters: Copenhagen, Denmark

A. C. Bang is a furrier originally from Copenhagen, Denmark. It was founded in 1816 and had status of Purveyor to the Court of Denmark from 1905. Its former building, located at the corner of Østergade (No. 27) and Bremerholm, is from 1932–34 and was designed by Bent Helweg-Møller. It now consists of a shop in Zurich and a shop in Tokyo.

== History ==
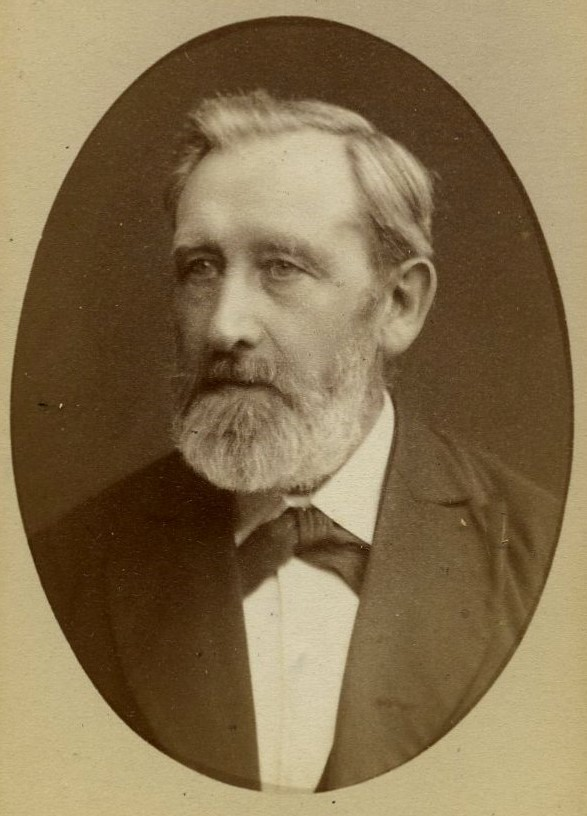
Anton Christian Bang

The company was founded by Jørgen Daniel Bang (1790–1864) on 6 September 1816 when he opened a store in his father's building at the corner of Østerfade and Kongens Nytorv. He received a commission for bearskins for the Royal Life Guards and was appointed royal furrier in 1817.

Bang's son, Anton Christian Bang (1823–1897), took over the company after his father's death in 1861. In 1888 he ceded it to his son Oscar Bang (1863-) who renamed it after his father. The company had many customers in the Danish royal family and was in 1905 once again appointed to royal furrier (from 1963: Purveyors to the Court of Denmark). In 1908 it opened a branch specializing in wholesale one the other side of Østergade.

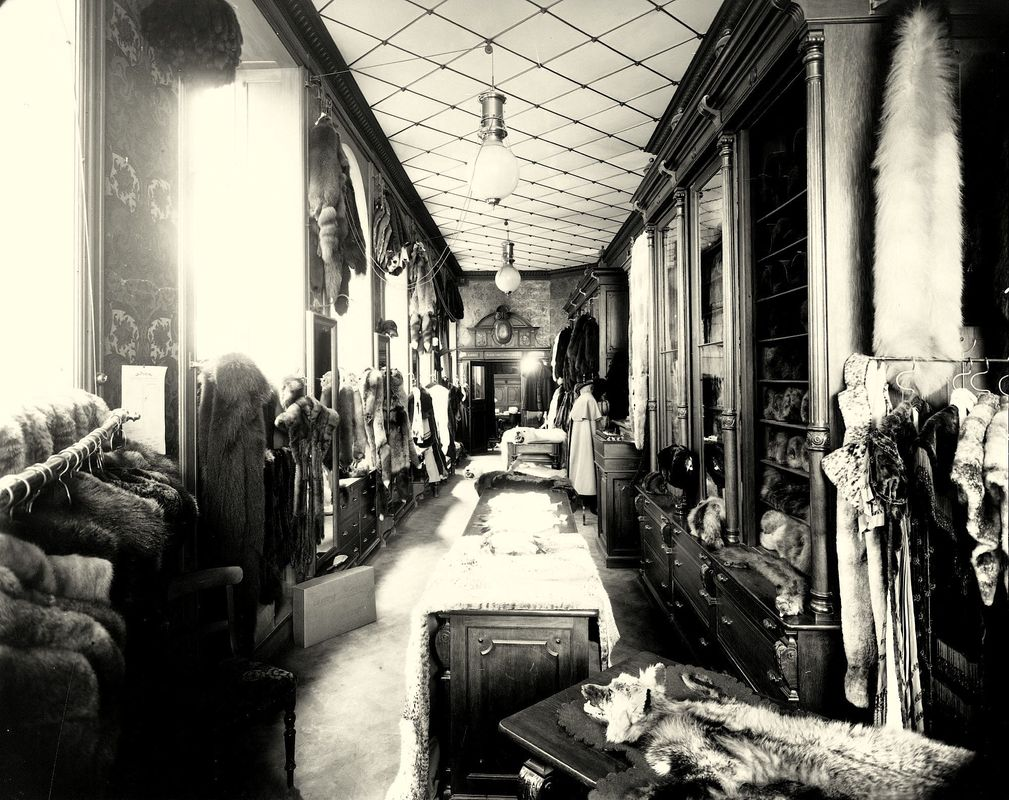
The interior of the shop at Østergade 25 photographed by Peter Elfelt in 1904

Oscar Bang's son Aage Bang (1891–1955) took over the company after his father's death in 1923. He commissioned a new headquarters for the company which was inaugurated at the corner of Østergade and the new street Bremerholm in 1934. In the 1950s A. C. Bang won an international reputation for its mink furs. It launched a collaboration with Balmain, creating furs that were specially adapted for Erik Mortensen's dresses. The ownership of the company passed out of the Bang family.

The 1980s were difficult times for the fur industry internationally and A. C. Bang's stores began to focus on jewelry, accessories and high-end fashion clothing. The market for fur improved somewhat in the 1990s. A. C. Bang opened a second store on Lyngby Hovedgade in Kongens Lyngby and its products were also sold in a high-end chain of department stores in Japan. It has retail shops in Tokyo and Zürich.

== Building ==
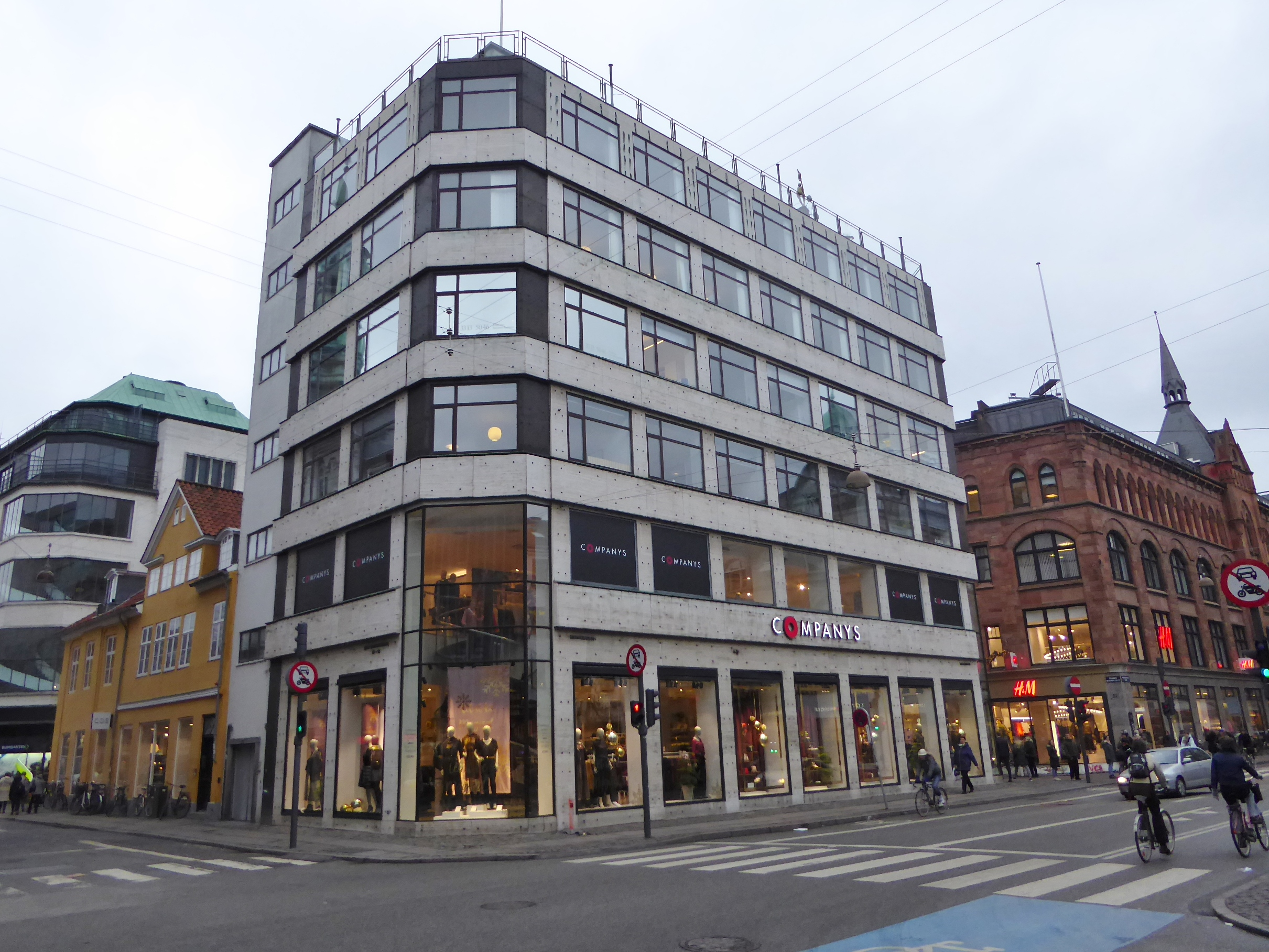
A. C. Bang's former building seen from Bremerholm in Copenhagen

The company's former headquarters at the corner of Østergade and Bremerholm is a seven-story Modernist building. A tall pillar with a statue of Diana trying to catch a small fur animal runs along the full height of the building and a few meters higher on its Strøget side.
