= Niels Brock House =

Building in Copenhagen

- Niels Brocks Gård
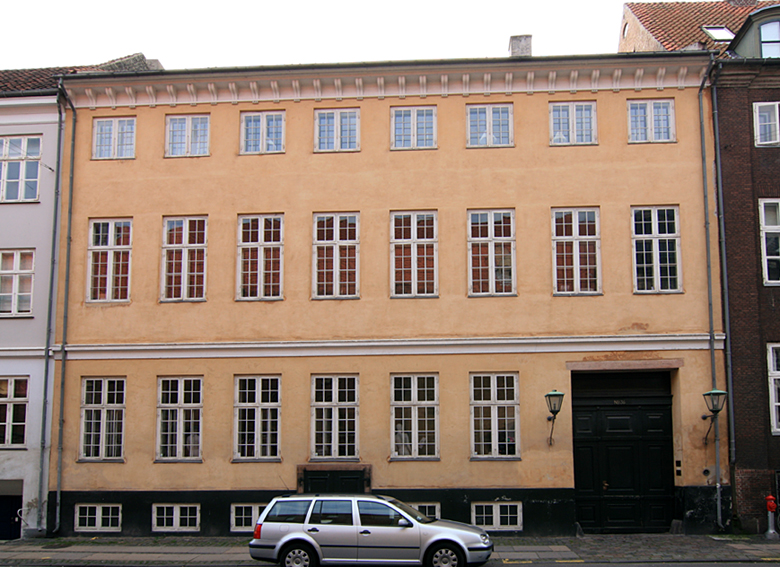
- The Niels Brock House
- Interactive map of the Niels Brock House area

General information
- Location: Copenhagen, Denmark
- Coordinates: 55°40′28.75″N 12°35′27.86″E
- Inaugurated: 1780
- Client: Niels Brock

The Niels Brock House is a historic property located at Strandgade 36 in the Christianshavn neighbourhood of Copenhagen, Denmark. The property comprises the former warehouse at Wildersgade 51 on the other side of the block as well as a number of side wings in the yard. The building takes its name after the businessman Niels Brock for whom it was adapted in the 1780s. Other notable former residents include the historian Peter Vilhelm Jacobsen (1799–1848) and the businessman Christian August Broberg. The entire complex was listed in the Danish registry of protected buildings and places in 1918.

== History ==
=== Early history ===
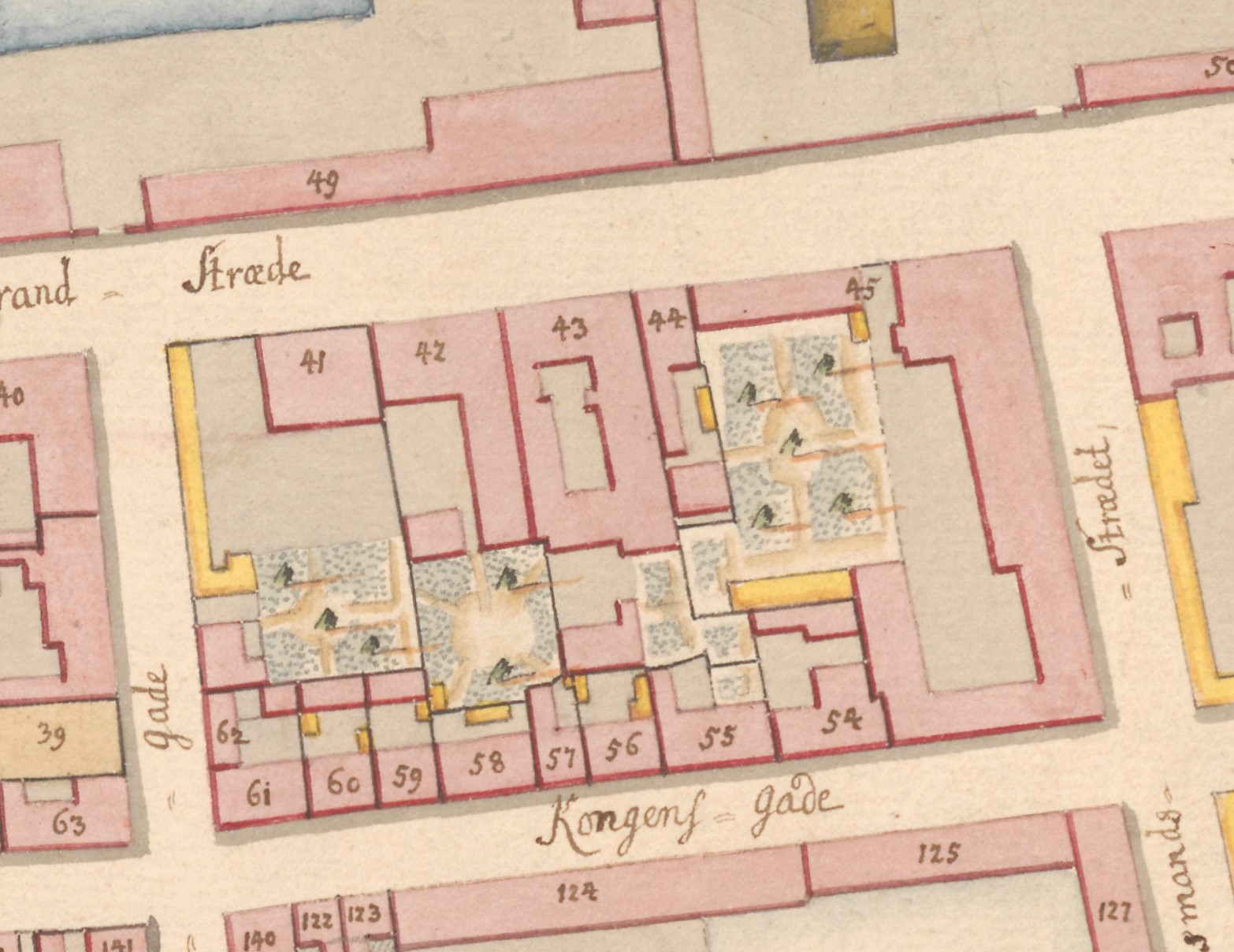
No. 42 seen on a detail from Christian Gedde's map of Christianshavn Quarter, 1757.

The property was listed as No. 25 in Christianshavn Quarter in Copenhagen's first cadastre of 1689. It was at that time owned by magister Peder Møller. The property was listed as No. 42 in the new cadastre of 1756 and was then owned by one etatsråd Lund.

=== Niels Brock ===
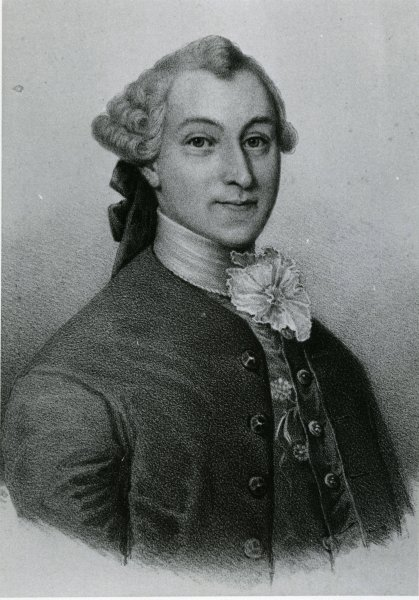
Niels Brock

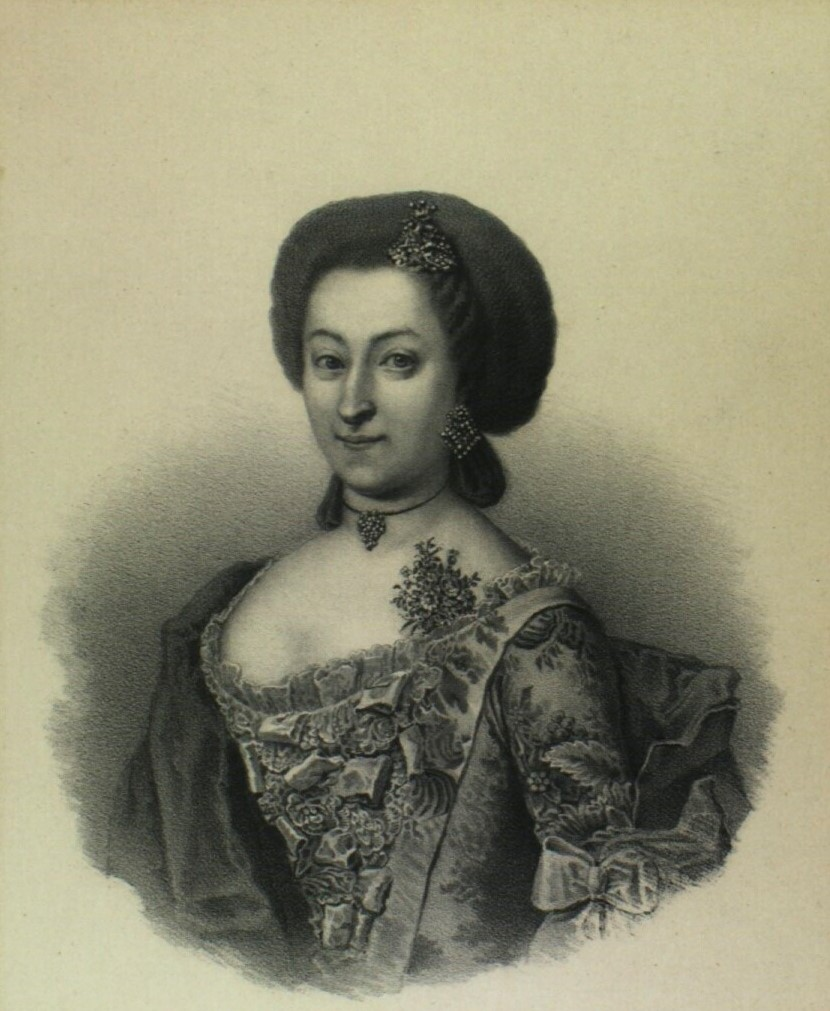
Lene Brock, née Bredal

The house was built for Niels Brock in 1780. Brock's household consisted of nine people in 1787. He resided in the building with his housekeeper M. C. Adolph, his bookkeeper Jens Perch, two clerks, a female cook, a maid, a coachman and a caretaker. The property was again home to nine residents at the 1801 census.

After Brock's death, the house was administered by Grosserer-Societetet; the proceeds were used for grants for Efterslægtens Skole.

=== Niels Brock Hansen ===
The property was listed as No. 40 in the new cadastre of 1806. It was at that time owned by Niels Brock Sommerfeldt (1772–1821). His father, Hans Nicolai Sommerfeldt, was a teacher at Randers Latin School and Niels Brock was his godfather. His sister Helene was married to another Niels Brock, namely Niels Brock Hansen, who owned Strandgade 24. One of their brothers was commodore Søren Siemsen Sommerfeldt (1661–1827), whose grandson Wilhelm Ferdinand Sommerfeldt would more than half a century later establish the wine retailer Kjær & Sommerfeldt a few houses down the street at Strandgade 27.

=== Christian August Broberg ===
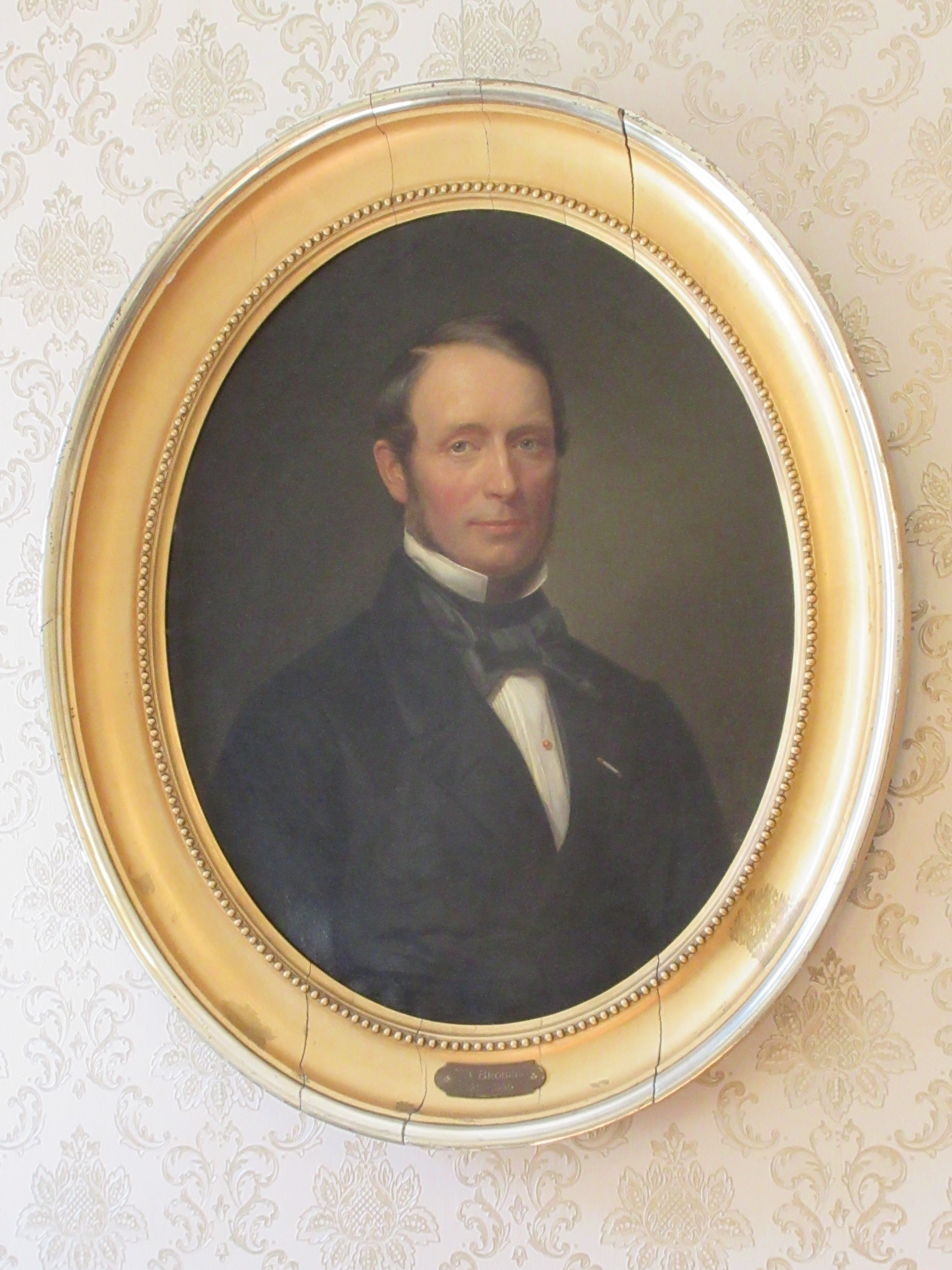
Painting of C. A. Broberg in the Geering House in Copenhagen

The merchant and politician Christian August Broberg (1811–1886) resided in the building from 1837 to 1880. The nearby street Brobergsgade is named after him. The historian and writer Peter Vilhelm Jacobsen (1799–1848) lived in the building from 1846 to 1848.

Broberg occupied the entire building at the 1860 census. He lived there with his wife, their four children, two housekeepers (husjomfruer), a female cook, a maid, a male servant and a caretaker.

=== 1880–1900 ===
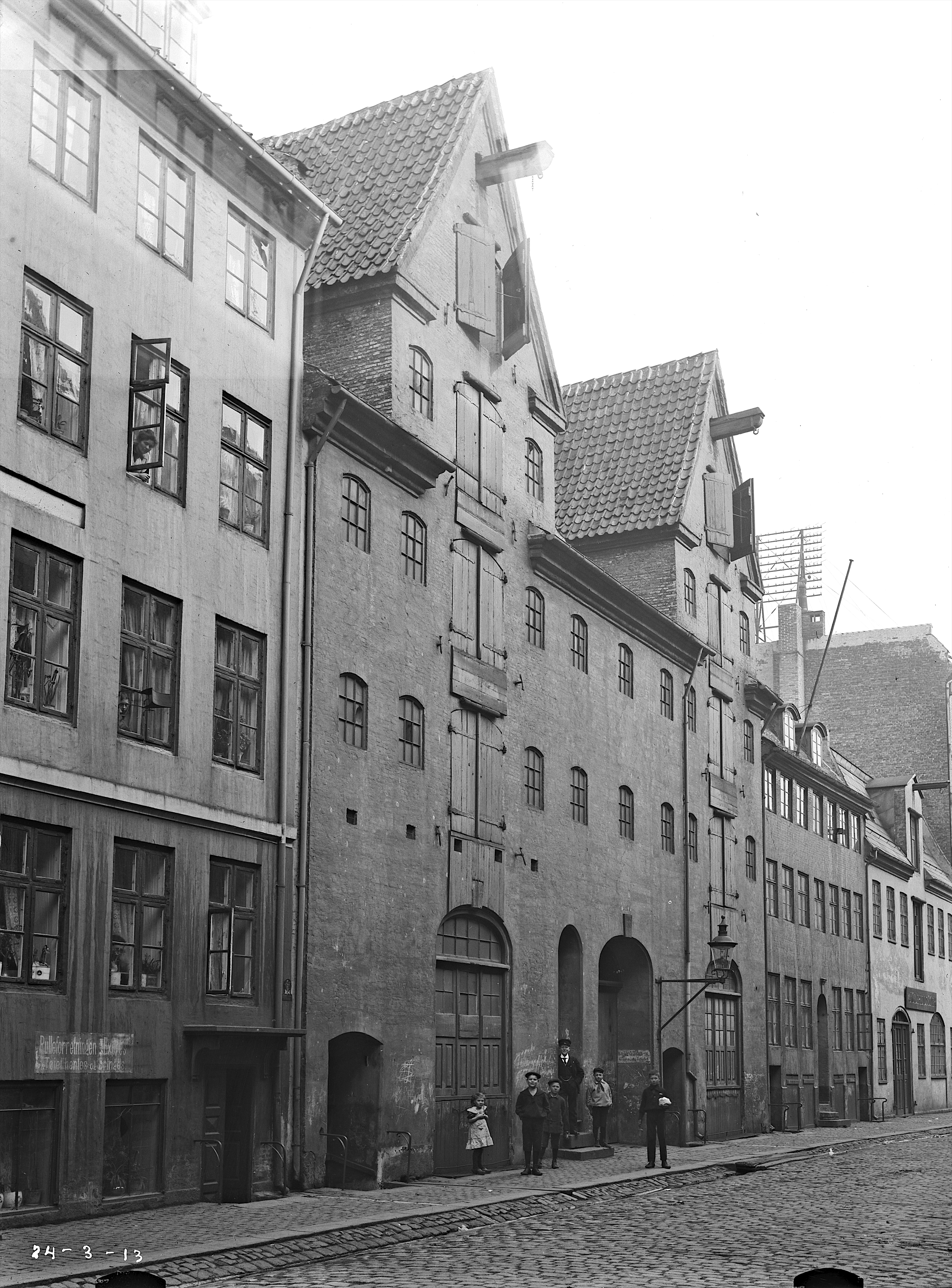
Wildersgade 51 in 1913.

The property was acquired by master mason A. Aagaard before 1880. His property was home to 27 residents at the 1880 census. Carl August Broberg still resided on the first floor with his wife Camilla Broberg, their three children (aged five to eight), his two unmarried sisters Anna and Marie (aged 36 and 43), a nanny, a nurse, two female cooks, one male servant and one maid.

=== Styhr & Kjær ===
The next owner of the property was Styhr & Kjær, a trading house founded on 2 August 1866 by Rasmus Selgen Styhr and Peter Bernhard Kjær. Sthyr & Kjær sold the property to J. J. Carøe, a leading importer of tea and spices led by Henri Odewahn and K. Gram. They undertook a comprehensive restoration of the building with the assistance of the architect Bent Helweg-Møller.

== Architecture ==
The house was renovated by the architect Bent Helweg-Møller in 1917–1918. The complex also comprises the warehouse at Wildersgade 51 on the other side of the block and a side wing along the north side of the courtyard that separates the two buildings.

== Gallery ==
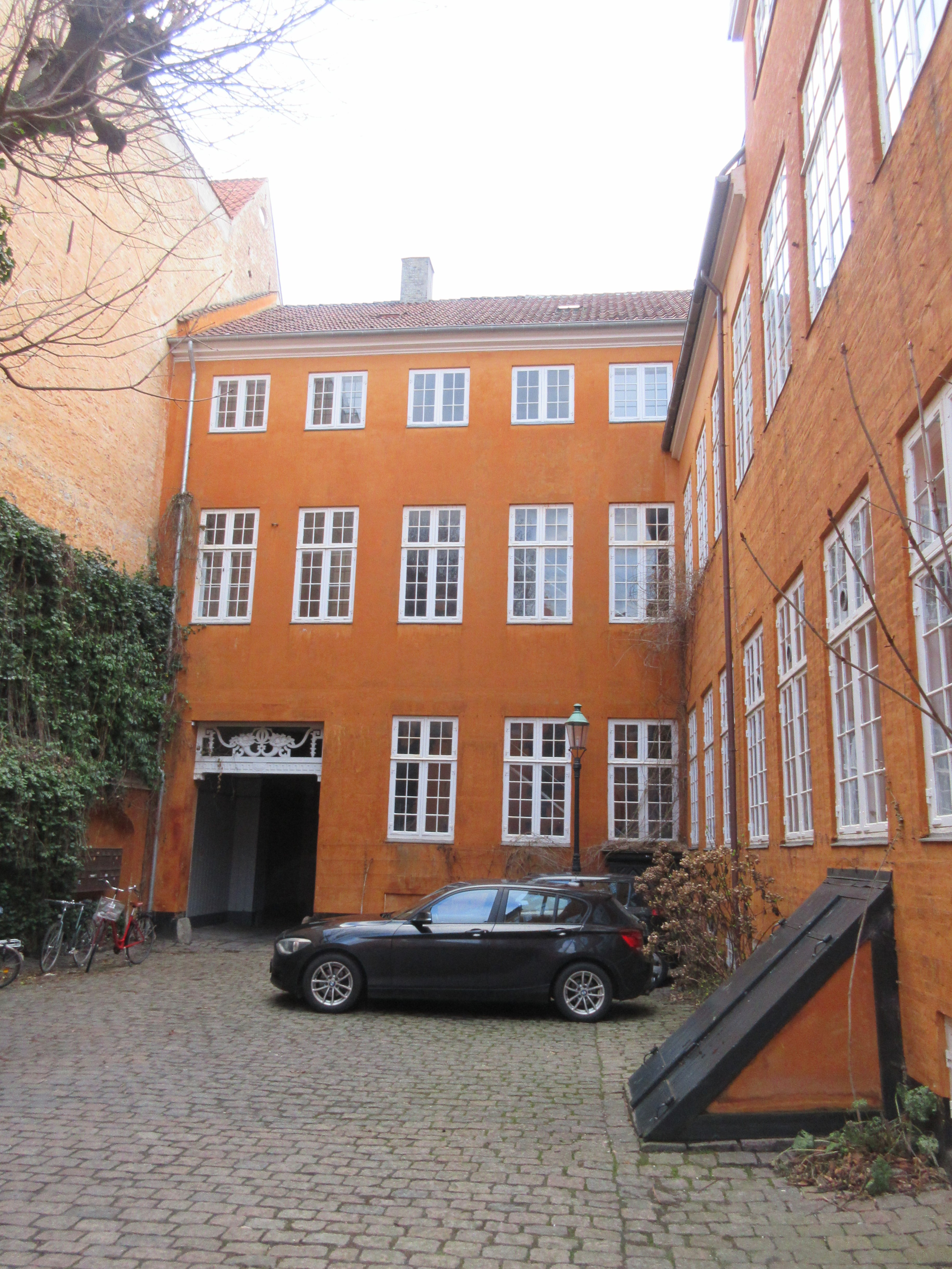
The building seen from the yard.

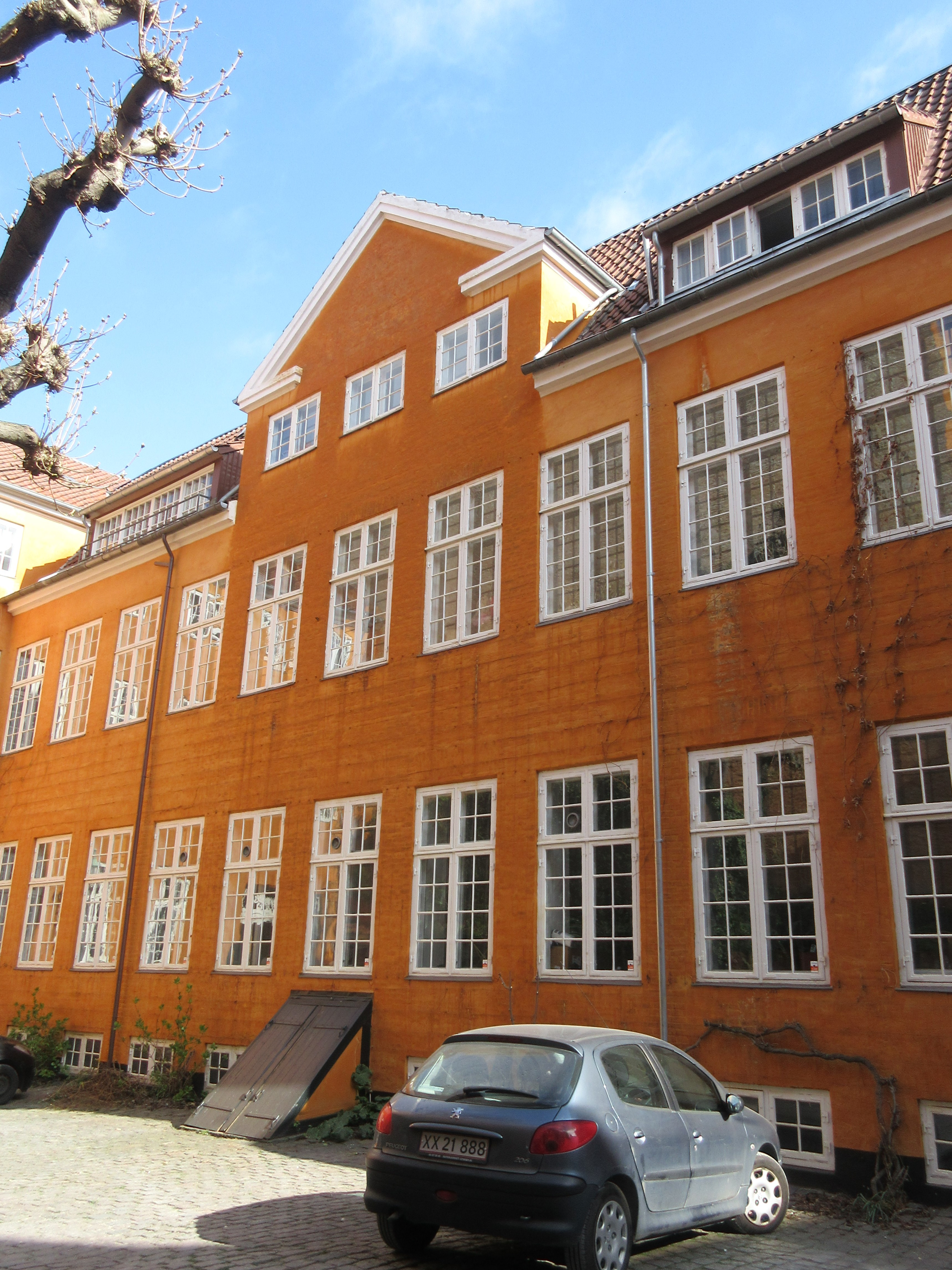
The side wing.

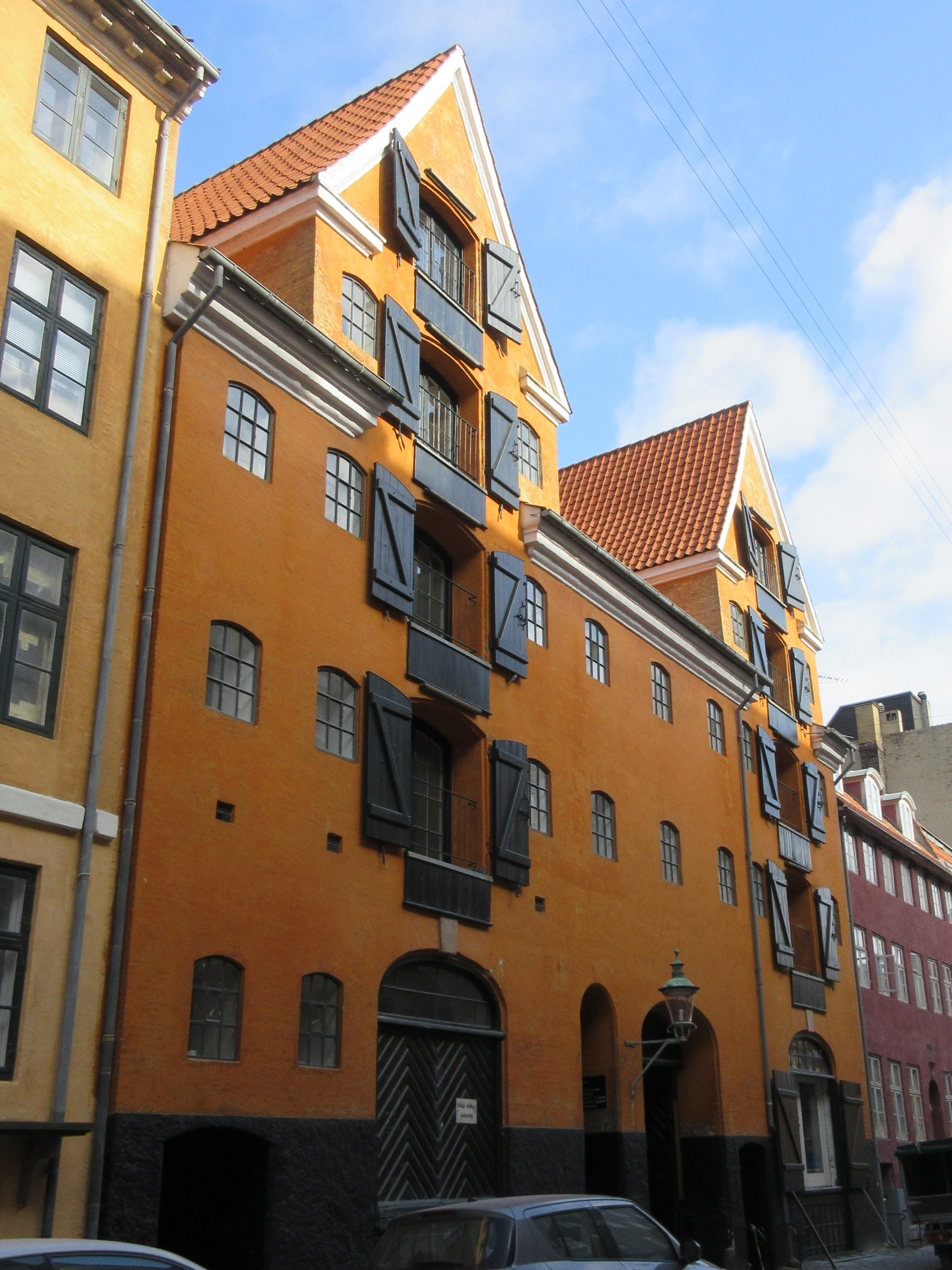
Wildersgade 51

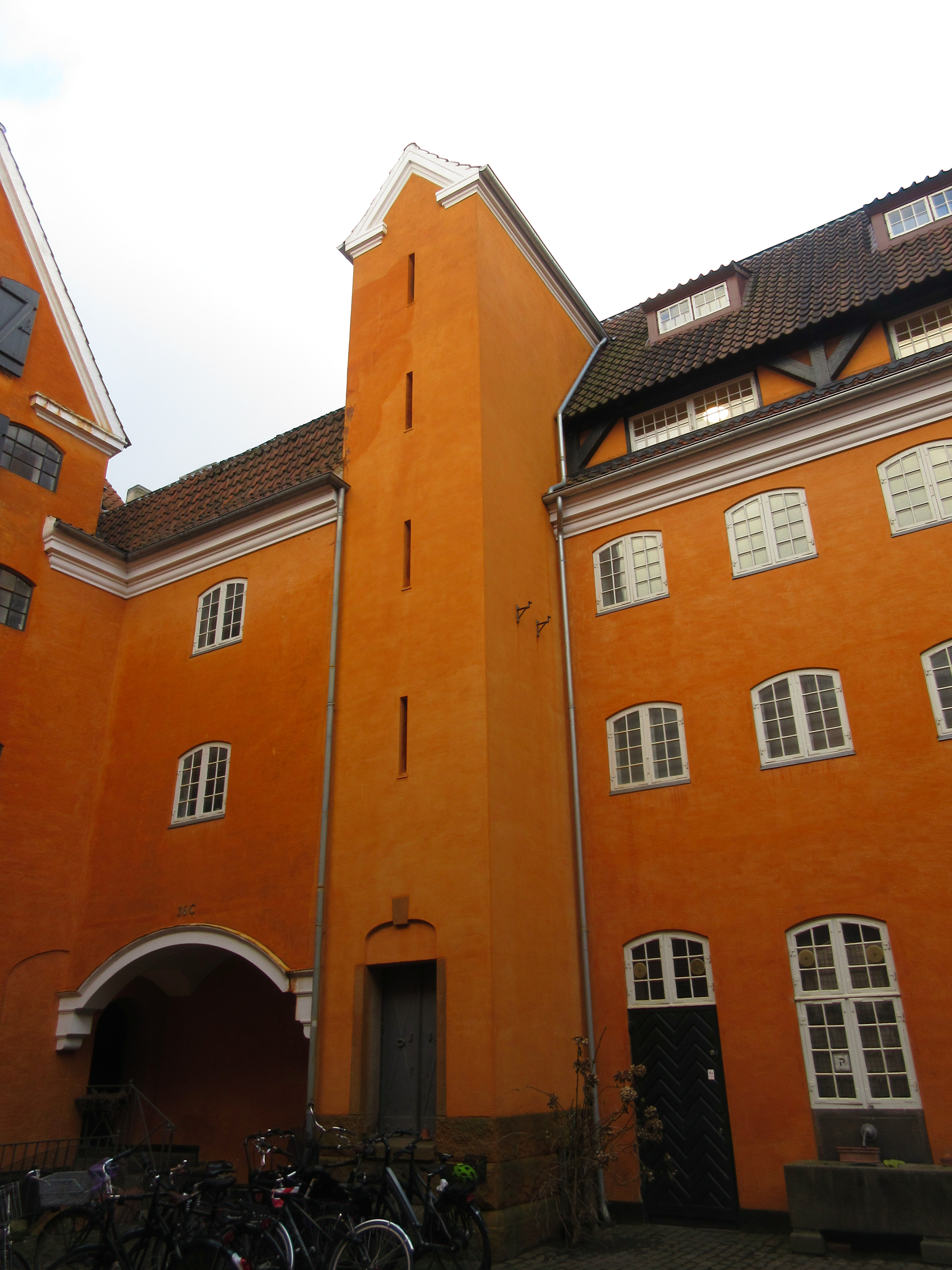
Side wing of Wildersgade 51.

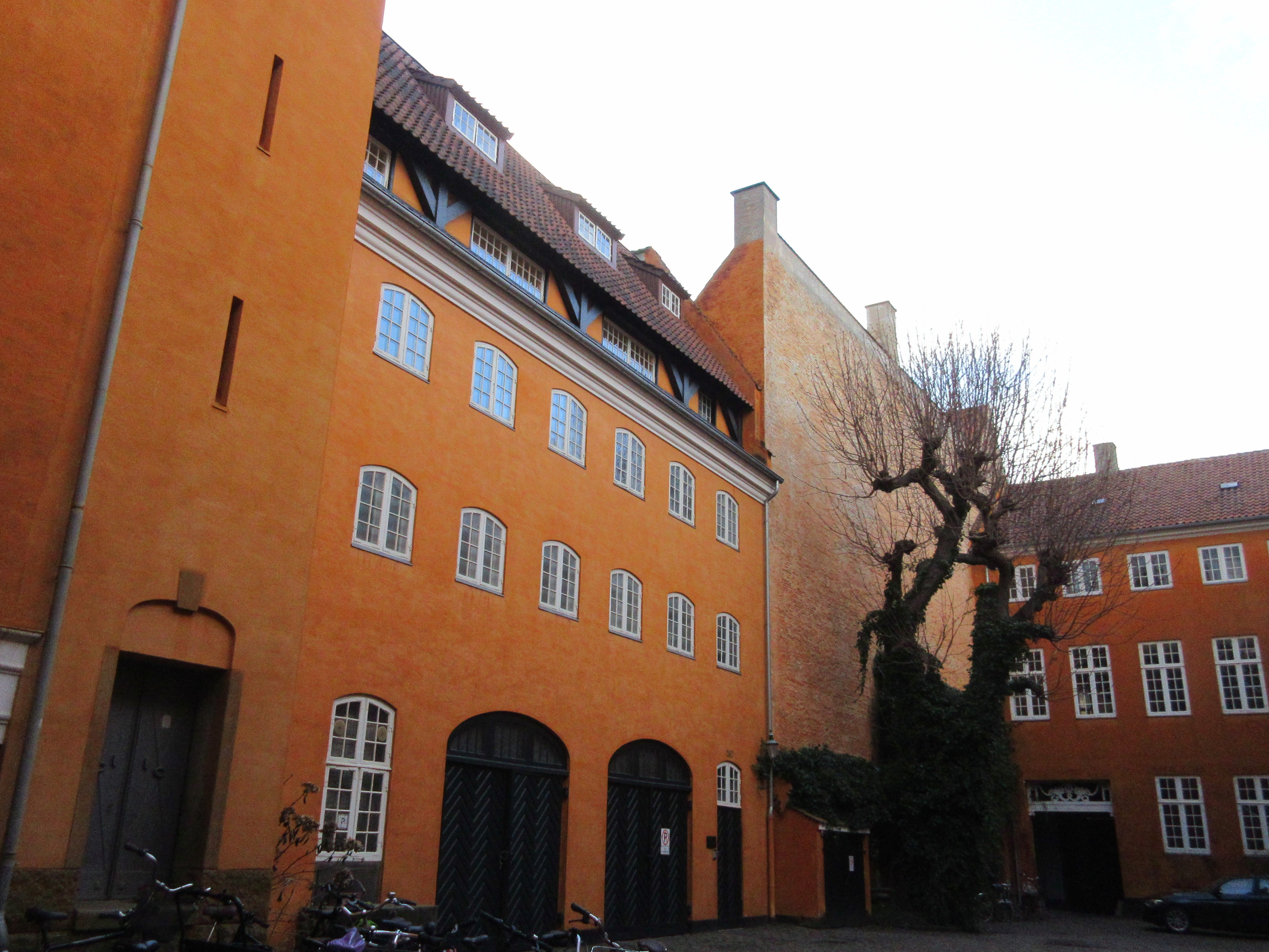
Southwest side of the yard.

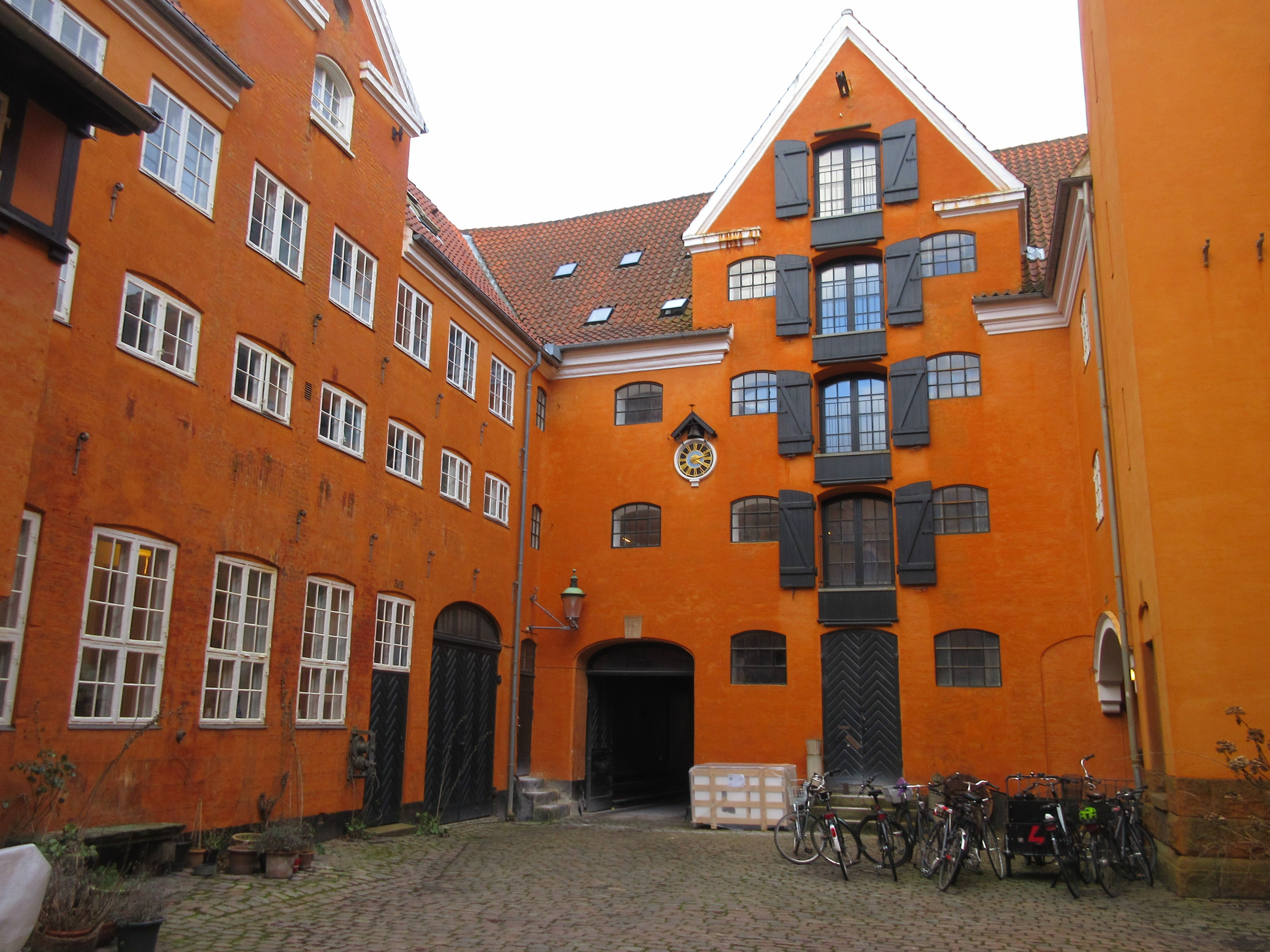
Rear side of Wildersgade 51.

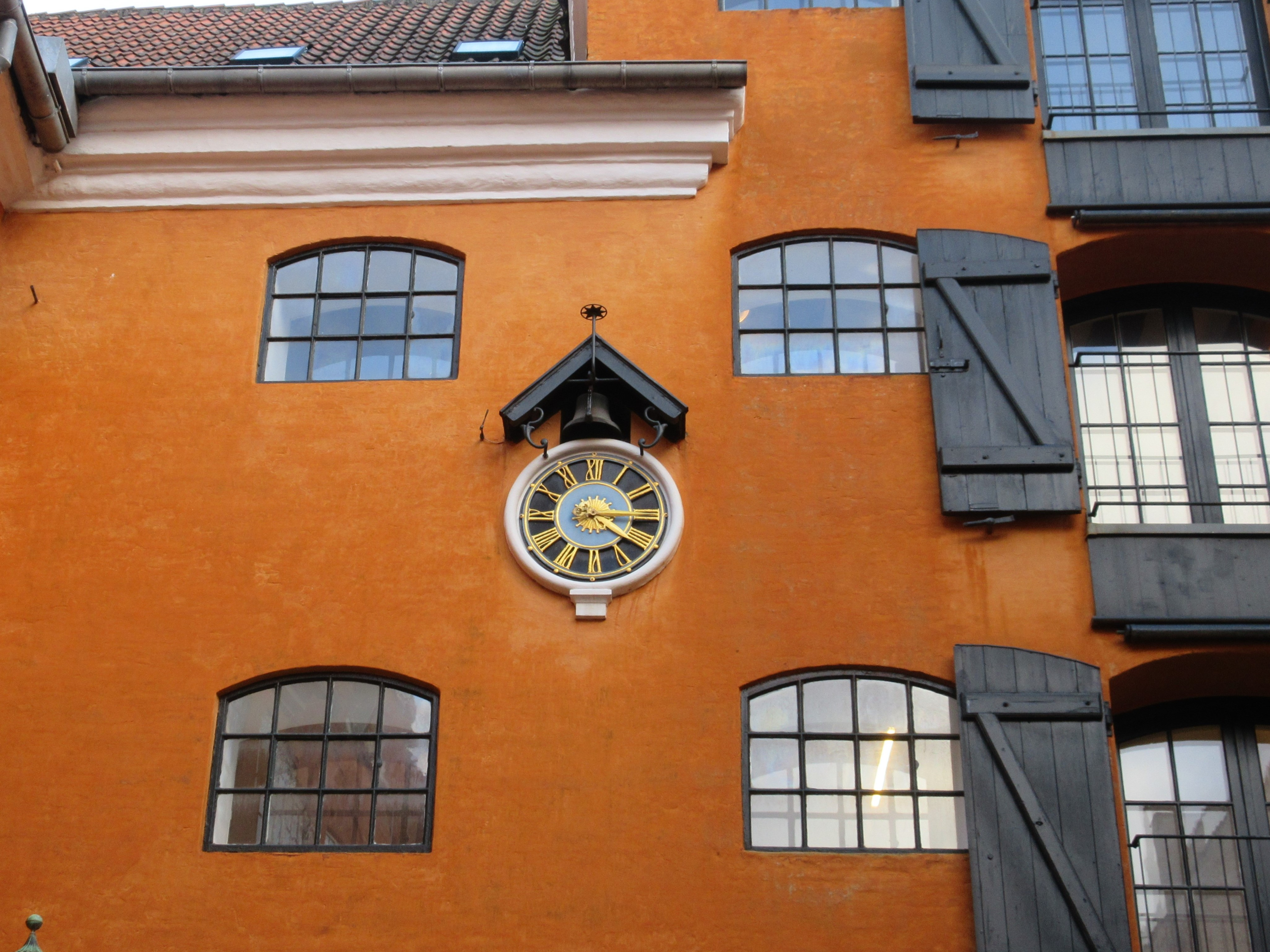
Clock on the rear side of Wildersgade 51.
