= Odense City Hall =

City hall in Odense, Denmark

Coordinates: 55°23′46″N 10°23′20″E

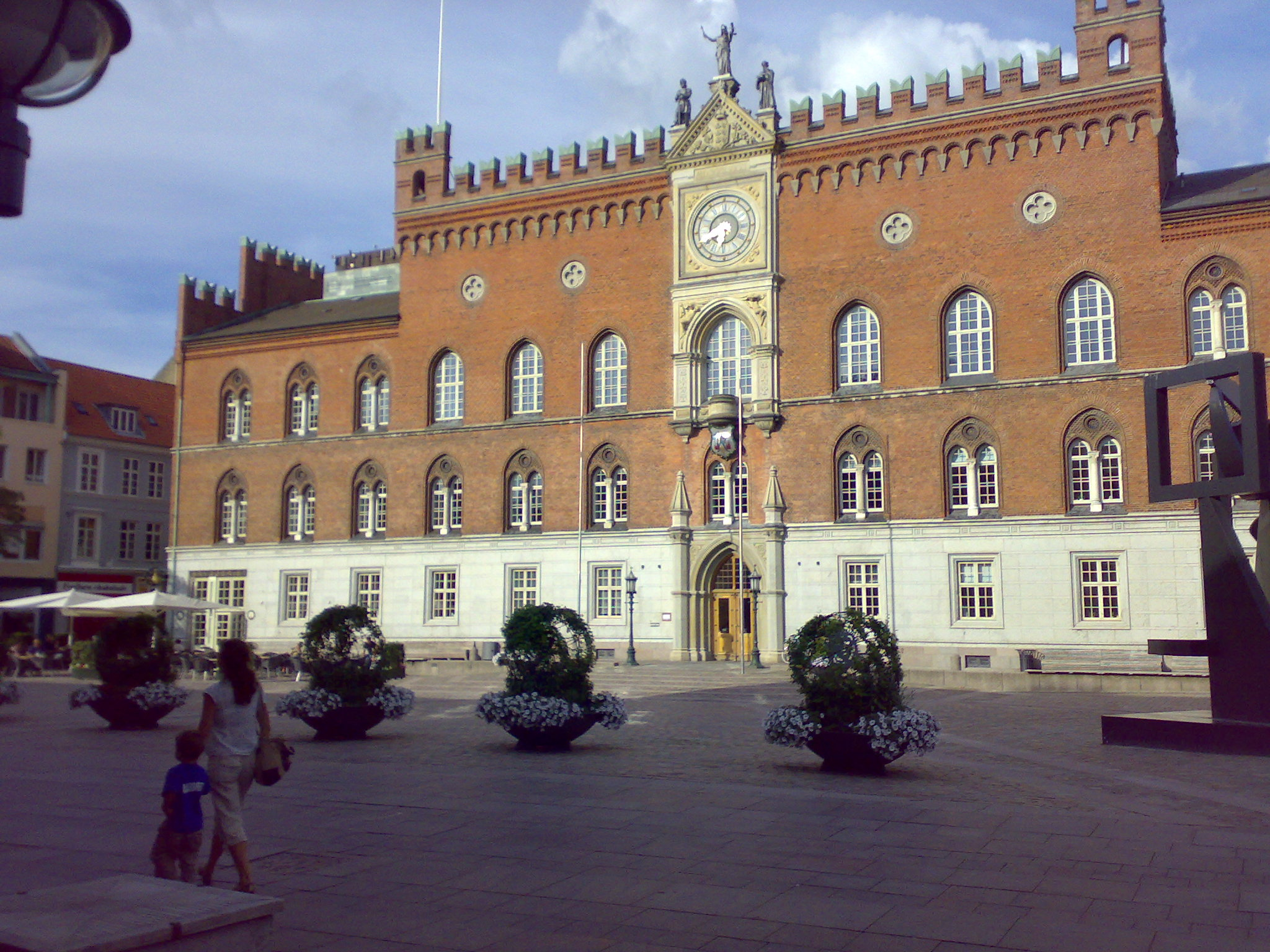
Odense City Hall

Odense City Hall (Danish: Odense Rådhus) houses the administrative offices of Odense Municipality in the city of Odense on the Danish island of Funen.

Today's building was designed by Johan Daniel Herholdt and Carl Lendorf in the Historicist style, inspired by Italian buildings such as the Palazzo Pubblico in Siena which it closely resembles. Completed in 1885, tts red masonry bears sandstone decorations, stepped gables and a saw-tooth course. It stands on the site of a smaller building from 1480. In 1937, Bent Helveg-Møller won the competition for the building's enlargement. The tower over the main entrance was torn down in 1942 but was not rebuilt. As work was delayed during the war, the extension was not completed until 1955. In conjunction with Hans Christian Andersen's 200th anniversary in 2005, comprehensive renovation work was completed on the building's interiors, including the entrance halls, meeting rooms, banqueting hall and council chamber.
