= Klostergården, Copenhagen =

Building in Amagertorv, Copenhagen, Denmark

Klostergården
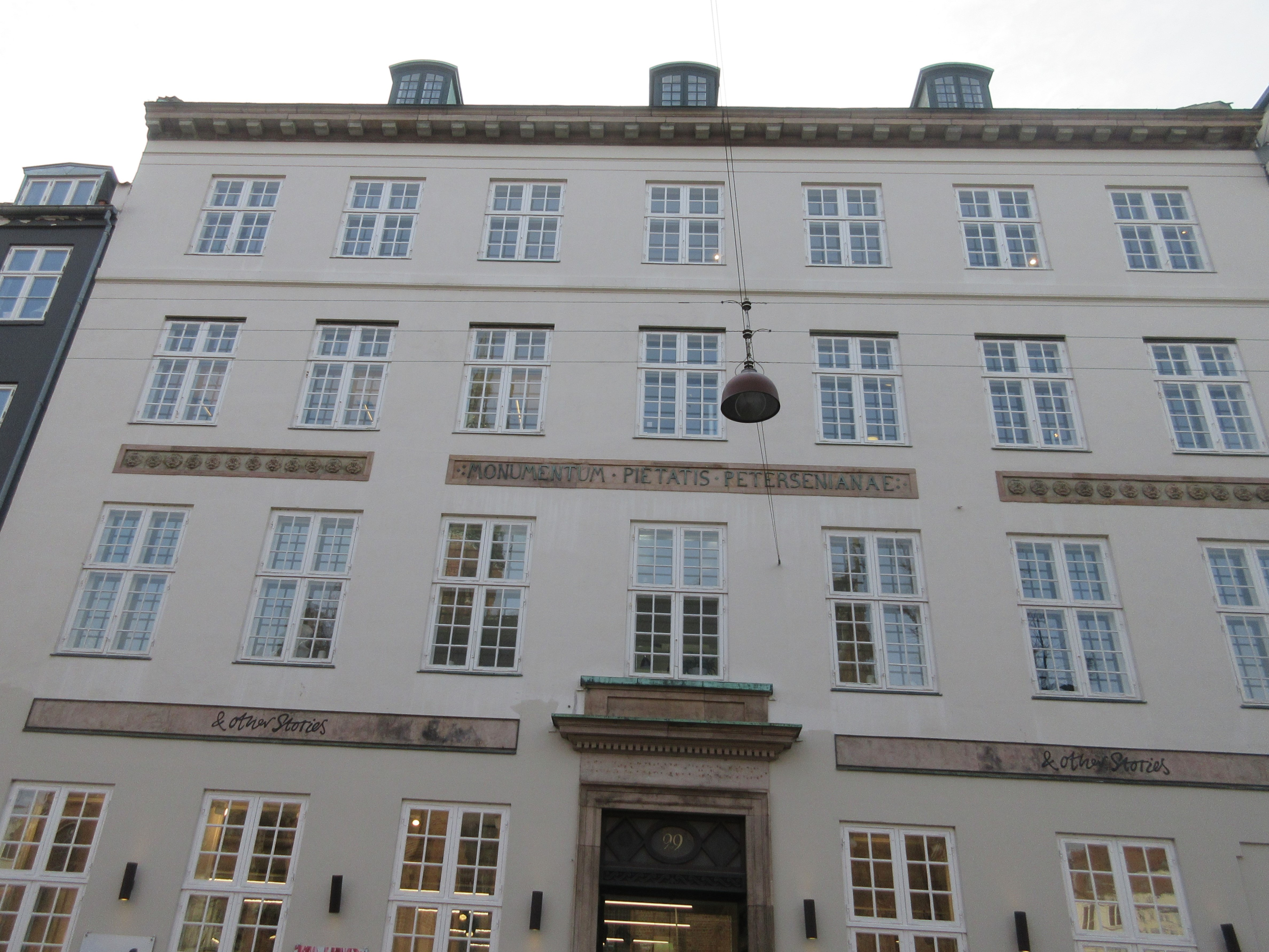
- Interactive map of the Klostergården area

General information
- Location: Amagertorv 29, Copenhagen, Denmark
- Coordinates: 55°40′42″N 12°34′37″E
- Completed: 1769

Klostergården, also known as Det Petersenske Jomfrukloster, is a listed Neoclassical property on Amagertorv (No. 29) in the Old Town of Copenhagen, Denmark. The rear side of the building faces Læderstræde. A passageway, Klostergangen, passes through the building.

== History ==
=== Early history ===
Back in the 17th century, the site was made up of two separate properties, one on Amagertorv and one on Læderstræde. The property on Amagertorv was listed in Copenhagen's first cadastre from 1689 as No. 28 in Strand Quarter, owned by tailor Christen Jensen. The property on Læderstræde was listed as No. 47, owned by tailor Christen Simonsen-

The property on Amagertorv was listed in the new cadastre of 1806 as No. 32 in Strand Quarter, owned by coachman Jens Jensen. The property on Læderstræde was listed as No. 47m iwbed by Madame Petersen.

=== Det Petersenske Jomfrukloster ===
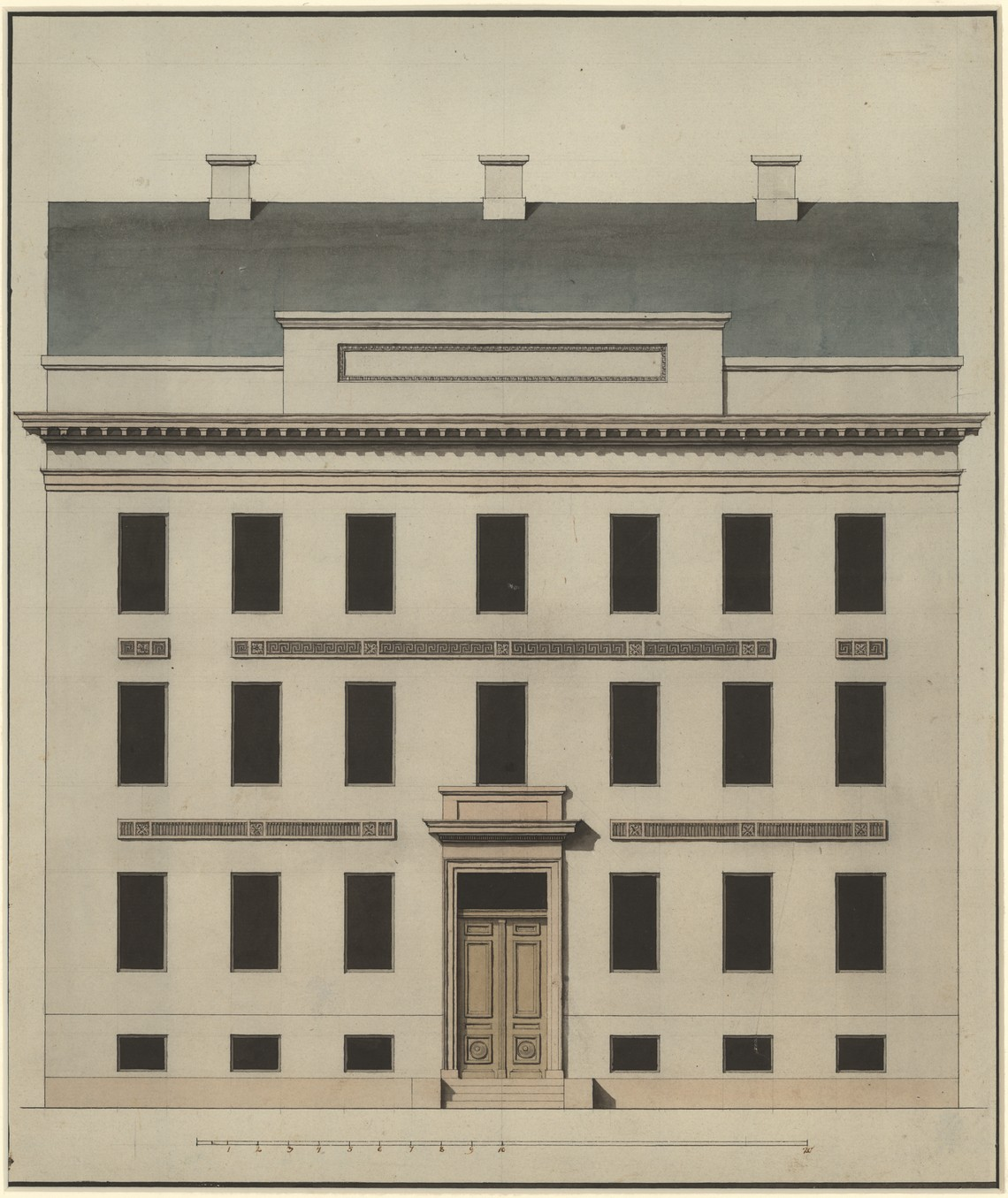
Rendering by Garsdorff

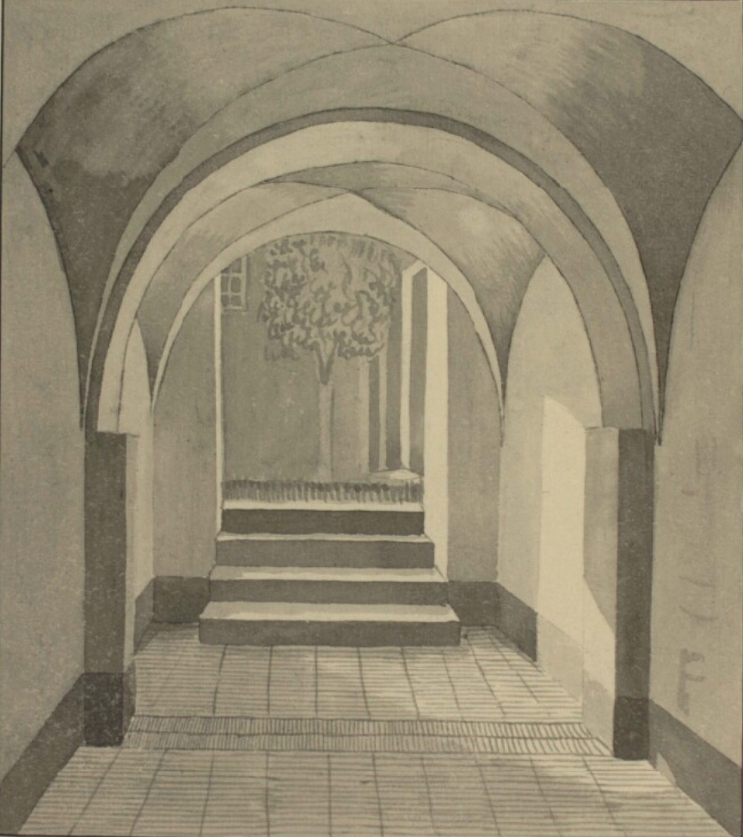
Brødrene Petersens Jomfrukloster, 1755

Det Petersenske Jomfrukloster, a Lutheran house of secular canonesses for the use of unmarried noblewomen, was founded in 1758 in accordance with a will dated 30 December 1755 by silk and textile merchant Albrecht Petersen and his brother Sebastian Petersen. Its original name was "de Brødrene Petersens Jomfru-Sæde eller "Kloster". The building was designed by Caspar Frederik Harsdorff in 1766 and it was completed in 1870.

The building was destroyed in the Copenhagen Fire of 1795 but rebuilt 1797–98 by Joseph Guione. It was expanded with an extra floor in 1880.

The property was purchased by the Klostergården property company in 1918. They commissioned Bent Helveg-Møller to undertake a renovation which received an award from the city in 1923.

== Architecture ==
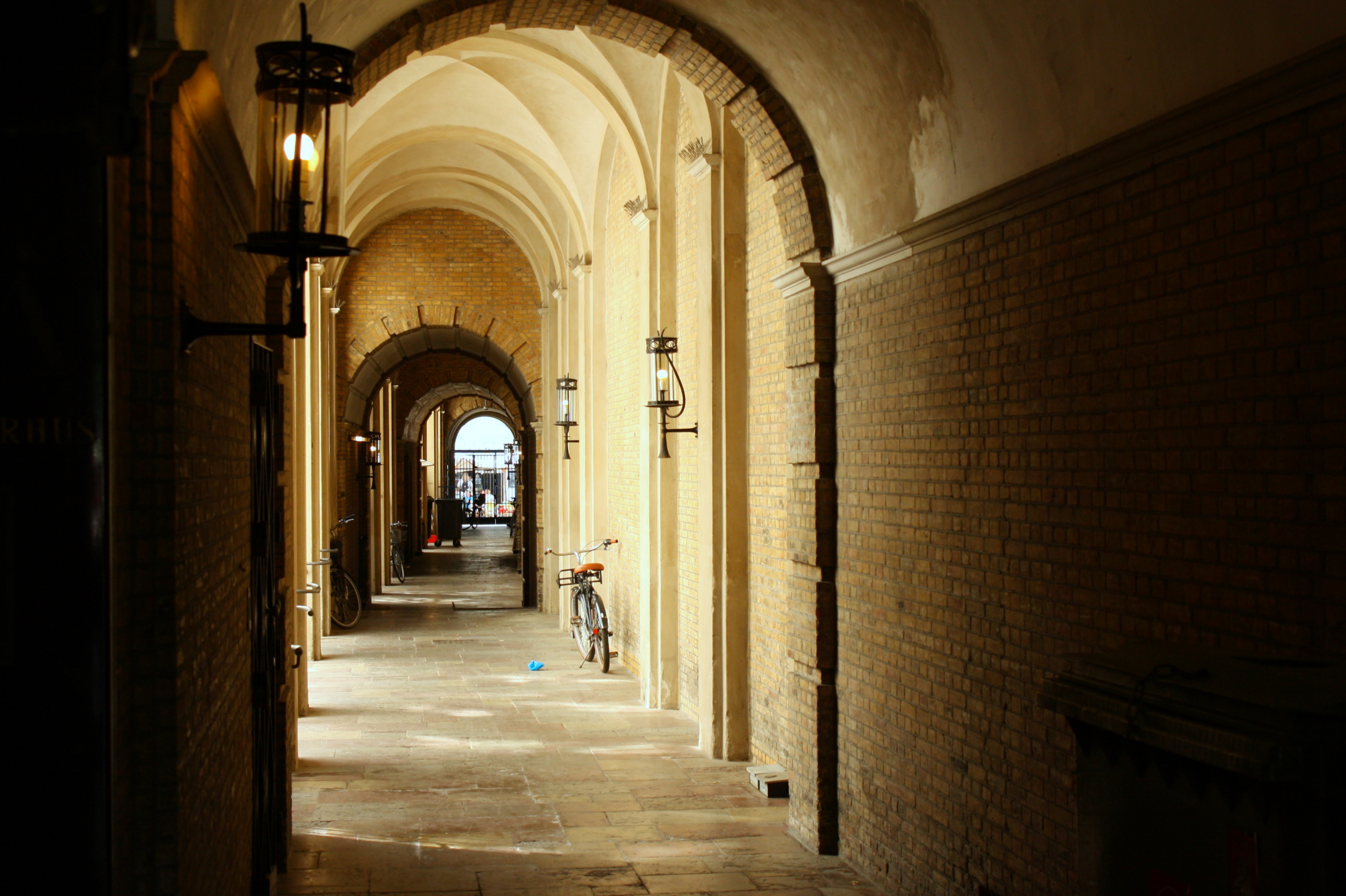
The passageway

Klostergården is part of a large block which is bounded by Højbro Plads to the east and Hyskenstræde to the west. The façade on Amagertorv is 10 bays long and has a four-bay central projection. A frieze with lettering between the first and second floor reads Monumentum Pietatis Petersenianae ("Memorial to the piousness of Petersen"). A gate to the right of the main entrance opens to a passageway, Klostergangen, which continues through three small courtyards before reaching Læderstræde on the other side of the block. It dates from Helveg-Møller's renovation in 1918.

== Today ==
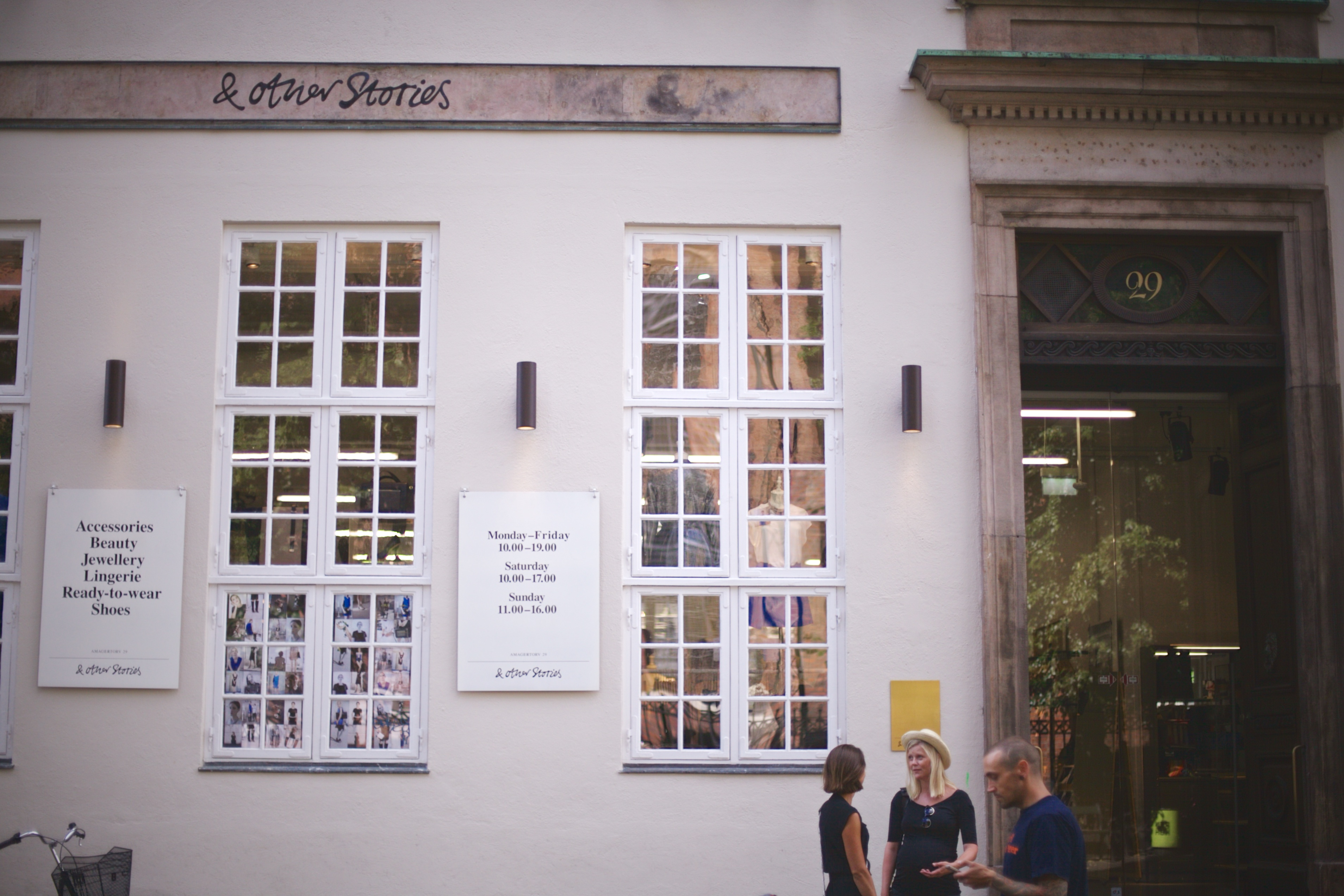
Facade detail of Amagertorv 29th

The building was purchased for DKK 200 million by Jorcks Ejendomsselskab in 2014. It contains an & Other Stories store (since 2013) on Amagertorv and a café called Café Zirup on Læderstræde.
