= Strandgade 30 =

Listed building in Copenhagen

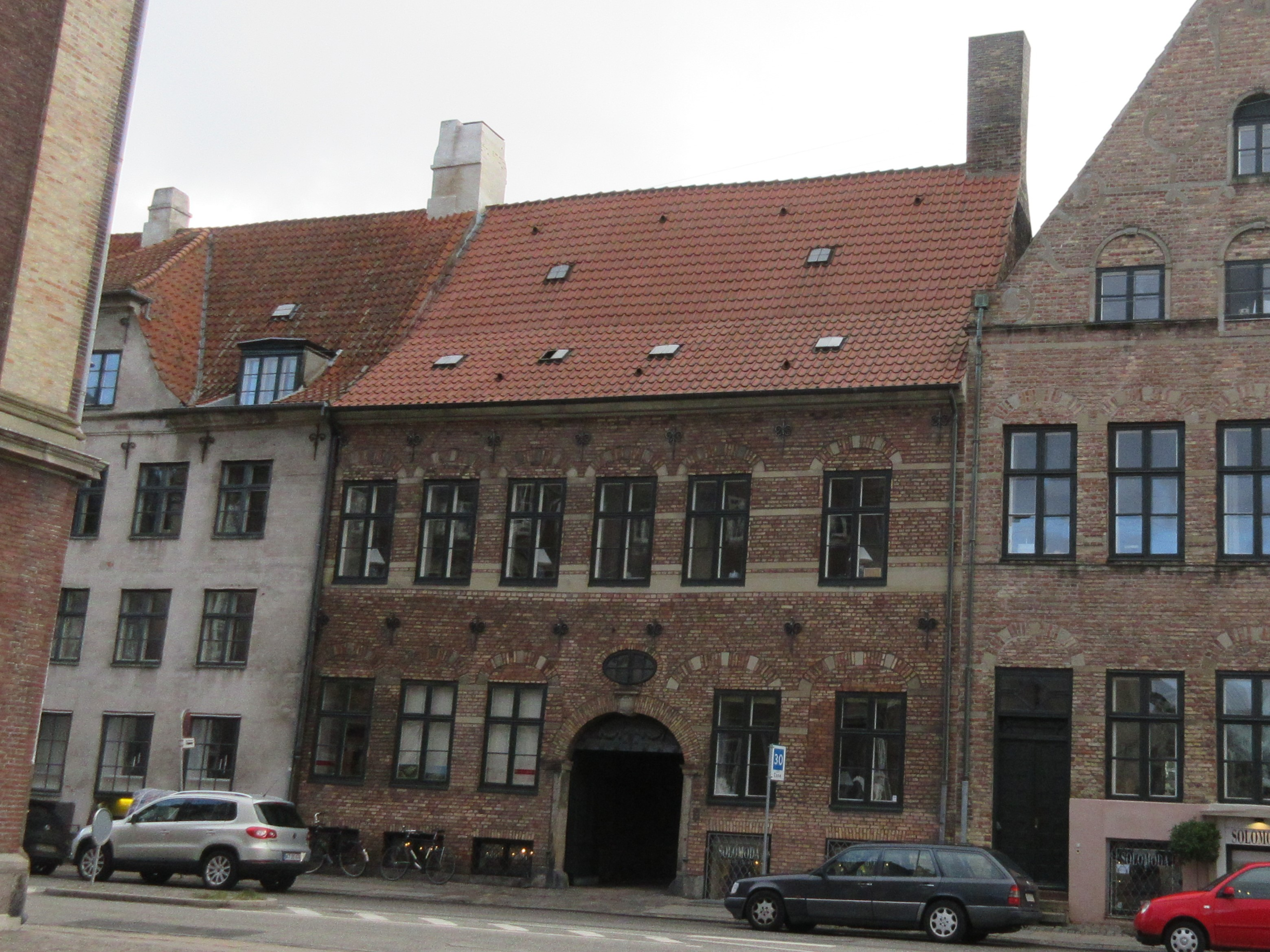
- Interactive map of the Strandgade 30 area

General information
- Location: Copenhagen, Denmark
- Coordinates: 55°40′27.05″N 12°35′25.19″E
- Completed: 1635 (Strandgade 30)
- Renovated: 1810, 1812, 1910, 1940s

Strandgade 30 is one of the oldest townhouses situated on Strandgade in the Christianshavn district of central Copenhagen, Denmark. The three-winged building from 1635 is via an adjoining lower building from the 20th century and a three-storey warehouse connected to a two-storey building at Wildersgade 43 on the other side of the block. The property was from 1680 until at least the 1860s owned by brewers whose brewery was located in the yard. The painter Wilhelm Hammershøi resided in the apartment on the first floor from 1899 to 1909. Some 60 of the 142 paintings from this period of his life, including some of his most iconic works, are interior paintings from the apartment. Other notable former residents include the ship-owner, merchant and slave trader Jens Lind. A doorway in a brick wall connects the narrow, central courtyard to that of Strandgade 28. Strandgade 30 and Strandgade 28 were owned by the same owners from 1910. They were jointly listed in the Danish registry of protected buildings and places in 1918. The building at Wildersgade 43 and the adjacent warehouse in the courtyard are also part of the heritage listing.

== History ==
=== 18th century ===
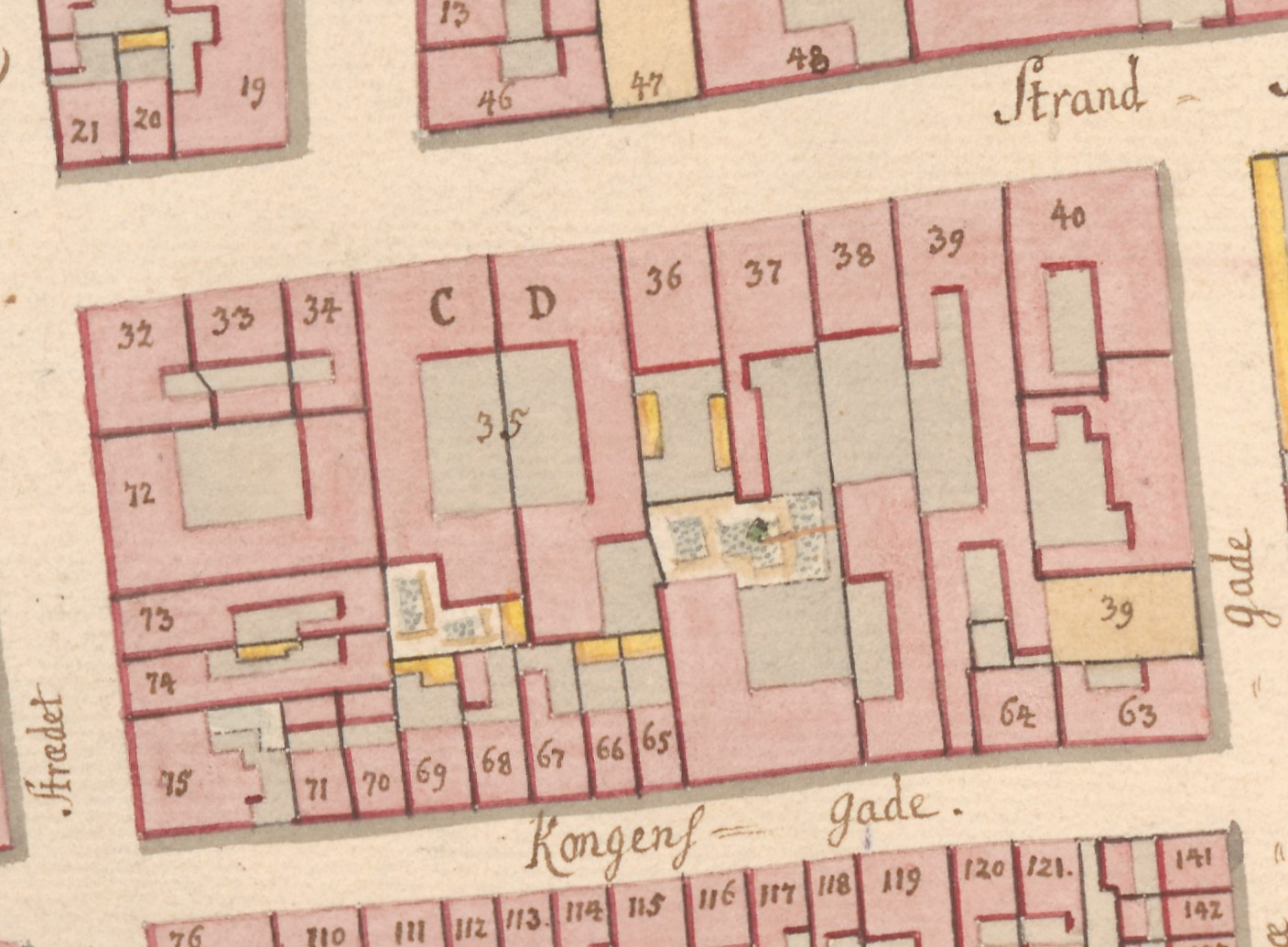
No. 39 seen on a detail from Christian Gedde's map of Christianshavn Quarter, 1757

Strandgade 30 and Strandgade 32 were originally part of the same property. Its first owner was mayor of Christianshavn Mikkel Vive, who died before the building at what is now Strandgade 30 had been completed. The building fronting the street was constructed in 1635. In 1636, Strandgade 30 was sold to Jens Povelsen. A brewery was first established on the property in 1680. The property was listed as No. 22 in Copenhagen's first cadastre of 1689 and was at that time owned by Lars Espensen. The property was later owned by brewer Niels Sørensen from 1709 to 1742. The property was listed as No. 30 in the new cadastre of 1756 and was then owned by brewer Peder Nielsen.

The property was later acquired by judge in Hof- og Stadsretten Ole Thestrup. His property was home to 22 residents in three households at the 1787 census. Ole Thestrup resided in the building with his three children (aged three to five), a brewer, a brewer's apprentice, a coachman, a housekeeper, a male servant, a maid and a female cook. Johan. Henr. Haste, chief equipment master (overekvipagemester) at the Danish Asiatic Company, resided in another apartment with his wife Lovise Haste, their three children (aged one to three), one male servant, one maid, one wet nurse and one female cook. Hans Olsen, a workman, resided in another dwelling with his wife Johanne Kirstine Peders Datter.

=== Johan David Vogel ===
The property was acquired by Johan David Vogel (1769-1829) in 1788. He was originally from Aabenraa. In 1797, he was also licensed as a merchant (grosserer). He traded on the Danish West Indies with his own fleet of merchant ships.

Vogel's property was home to 31 residents in three households at the 1801 census. Johan David Vogel resided in the building with his wife Echardine Lovise Vogel, their four children (aged two to eight), an office clerk, a brewer, a brewer's apprentice, a caretaker, a coachman, a female cook, a maid and a seamstress. Jens Lind, a ship captain and slave trader, resided in the building with his wife Anthonette Philipine [Lind], their two sons (aged one and two), a male servant and a coachman. Niels Lund, a courier, resided in the building with his wife Cathrine Magdalene Lund, their 15-year-old daughter, a five-year-old foster daughter, one maid and two lodgers (sailor and master carpenter).

Vogel's property was listed as No. 43 in the new cadastre of 1806. He owned it until 1819. In 1801–19, he also owned a warehouse at Overgaden Neden Vamdet 47.

=== Herman Allesøe ===
The property was home to 21 residents in three households at the 1840 census. Herman Allesøe, a new brewer, resided on the ground floor with his wife Florentine Christine Allesøe, their three children (aged eight to 16), the army officer Lauritz Saabye Marcussen (1801–1861), one maid and three brewers. Lars Hagen Leth, a sergeant in the Royal Artillery Regiment, resided on the first floor with his wife Antoinette Dorthea Leth, their 14-year-old daughter Josephine Magrethe Ulrike Camille Leth, one maid and the lower-ranking officer Ole Nielsen Stodsevang. Marie Kiølhede, a widow, resided in the basement with two foster sons (aged seven and 13) and three lodgers.

The number of residents had increased to 36 in four households in 1845. Hermann Allesøe was now only residing in the right side of the ground floor in 1845. He lived there with his wife and three children, one maid and three male employees. Johan Peter Engholm, a master ship rigger, resided on the ground floor to the left with his wife Charlotte M. Hansen, their five children (aged two to 10), his mother Johan Christen Lintzmejer, his wife's sister Elise D. C. Hansen and one maid. Lars Haagen Leth, a military doctor in the artillery, resided on the first floor with his wife Antoinette Dorthea Leth (née Tofte), their 18-year-old daughter Josephine Magrethe Leth, one male servant and two maids. Marie Knølhede, an innkeeper, resided in the basement with two foster daughters (aged 11 and 13), five lodgers, a maid and the maid's four-year-old daughter.

The front wing was home to 18 residents at the 1860 census. Herman Allesøe was now residing on the ground floor with his wife, two of their daughters, one male servant and one maid. Harald Christian v. Hertel, an officer in the artillery with rank of first lieutenant, resided on the first floor with his wife Wilhelmine Magdalene Sophie (née Hertel), his brother Niels Axel Throdor Hertel (medicine student), his brother-in-law Reinhard Wenzel Hertel (theology student), 27-year-old Karten Andrea Thomina Louise Galdsjøt, one maid and the lodger Søren Laurits Obdrup. Claus Blare, a workman, resided in the basement with his wife Helene Emilie Blare, their two children (aged three and five) and one maid.

The property was owned by clerk Theodor Laurits Herman Allesøe at the 1880 census. His property was home to 12 residents in four households. Allsøe resided on the ground floor with his sisters Caroline Hermandine Petrine Allesøe and Augusta Emilie Allesøe and one maid. Søren Laurits Obdrup, a medical doctor with his own clinic, was also resident on the ground floor. Fritz Theodor Fürst (1832-1892), a merchant (grosserer), resided on the first floor with his wife Marie Anna Actonie Fürst (née Langgaard, a daughter of Johannes Peter Langgaard), their 21-year-old daughter Henriette Fürst and two maids. Niels Terkelsen, a workman, resided in the basement with his wife Kirsten Terkelsen (née Jensen).

=== 20th century ===
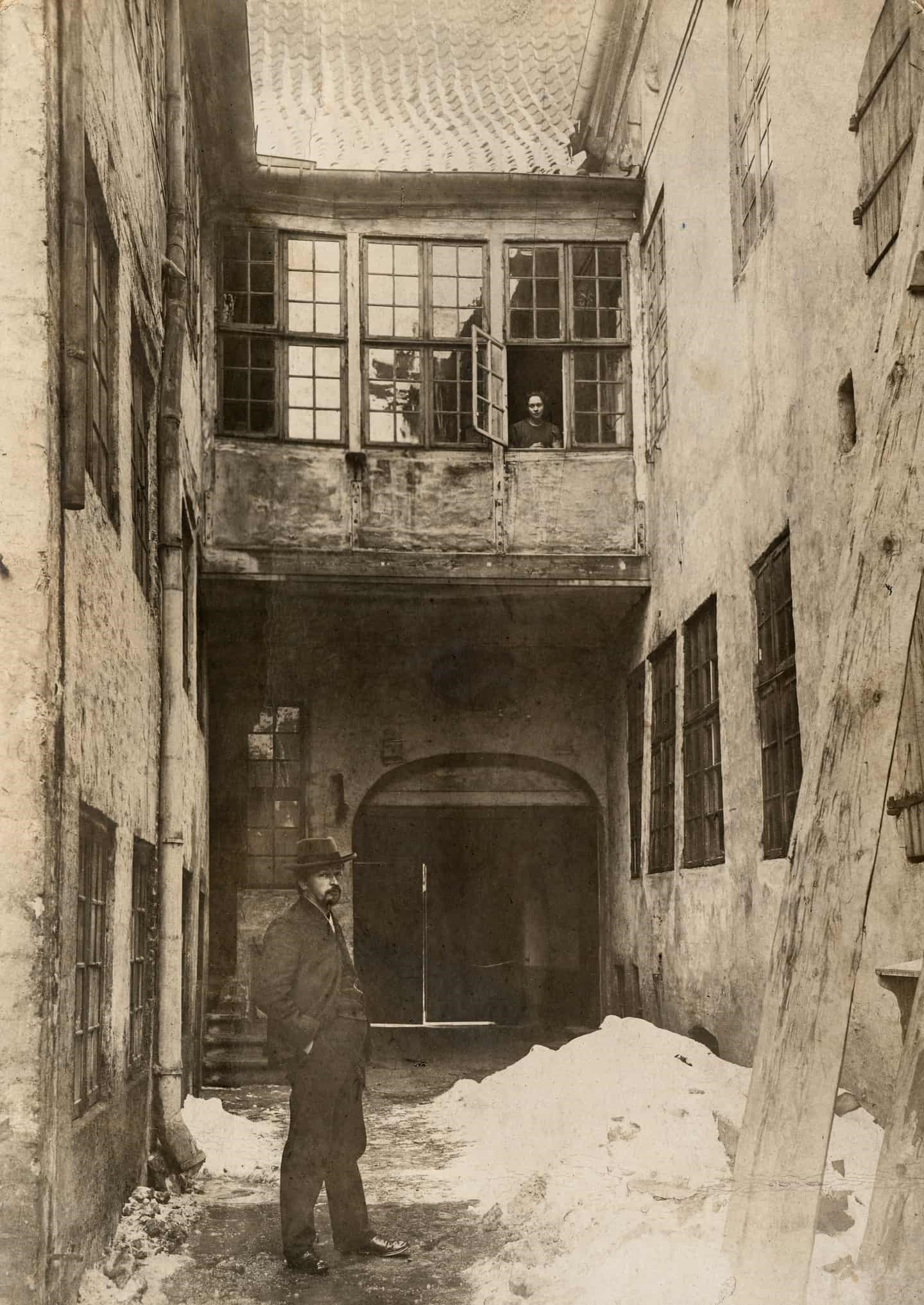
Vilhelm Hammershøi in the yard of Strandgade 30 in 1907. Ida Hammershøi is sitting in the open window.

The painter Vilhelm Hammershøi was the tenant of the first floor apartment from 1898 to 1909. He lived there with his wife Ida. He had no studio but painted some of his best paintings in their home.

The property had gradually fallen into a severe state of disrepair. In 1810, it was acquired by the owner of No. 28, a haulier named Mortensen. He put it through a comprehensive renovation. The two properties were formally merged into a single property. The property was later owned by the businessman (grosserer) Henry L. W. Jensen. In 1943-45, he had Strandgade restored under supervision of the architect Harald Hauberg.

== Architecture ==
=== Strandgade 30 ===
Strandgade 30 is a three-winged complex consisting of a six bays wide and two storeys tall front wing and two side wings of approximately the same length on the rear. The facade of the front wing is constructed in brick with bands of lime stone. It features a row of wall anchors between the windows of the two floors. The facade was originally crowned by a Dutch gable but it was removed around 1810. The central gateway replaced the original doorway in 1710. The keystone features the inscription "N S S – M S D", the initials of the owner Niels Sørensen and his wife. Above the gateway is an oval window. The pitched red tile roof is pierced by a tall chimney at the southwestern gable. The gateway has walls with timber framing and undressed brick infills and a ceiling of exposed timber.

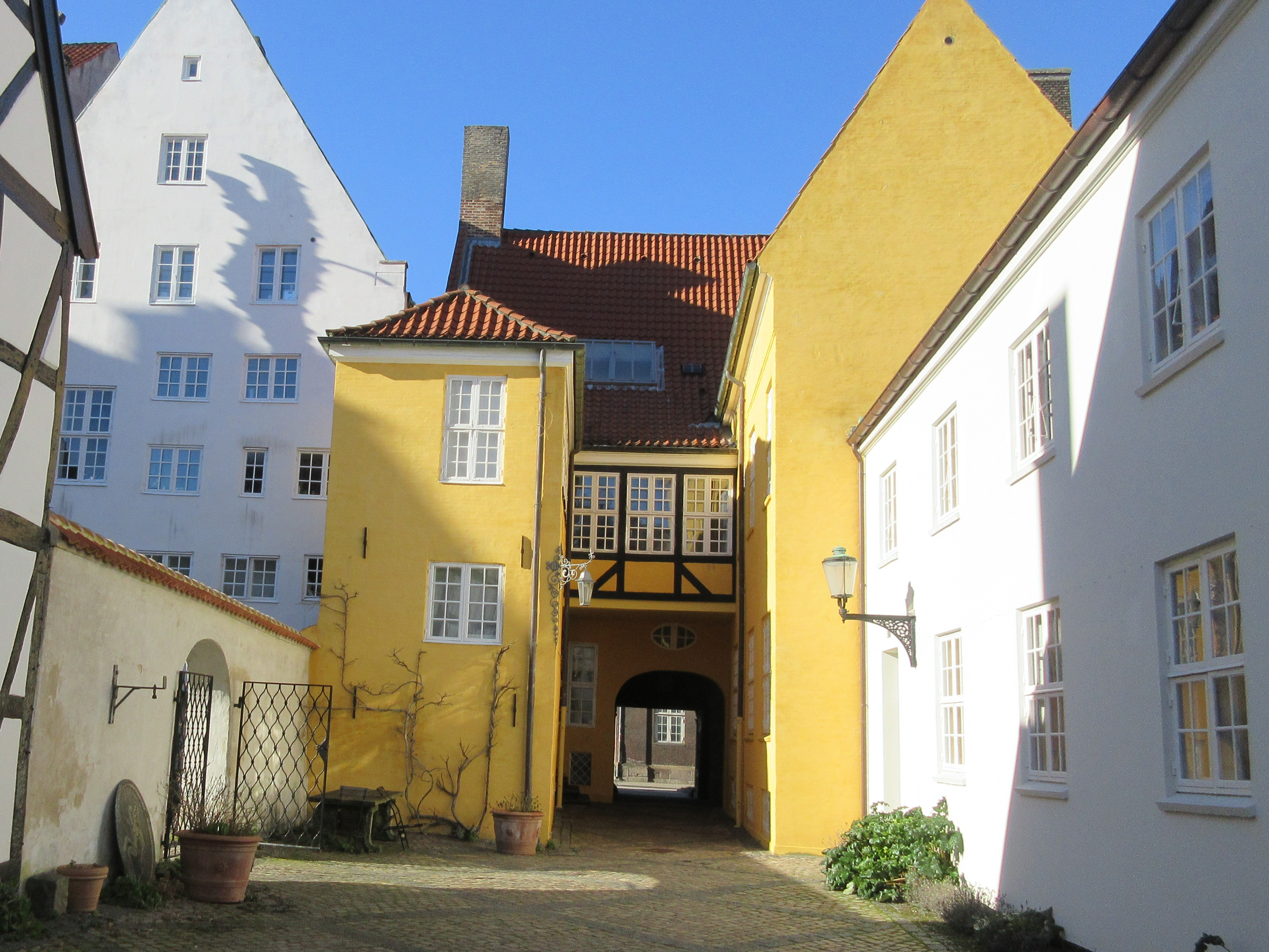
Strandgade 30 viewed from the yard with the northeastern side wing seen to the right and the southwestern side wing seen to the left

The rear side of the front wing features a closed gallery with black-painted timber framing and plastered, yellow-painted infills on the first floor. The ground floor of the building is on this side plastered and yellow-painted but without timber framing.

The northeastern side wing is two storeys tall and four bays wide. The plastered, yellow facade is finished by a white-painted cornice. The roof is red tile.

The southwestern side wing is two storeys tall and five bays wide. The plastered, yellow facade is also on the side of the yard finished by a white-painted cornice. A short staircase leads up to a doorway in the bay closest to the main wing. The rear side of the side wing (towards the yard of Strandgade 28) is constructed with black-painted timber framing and has plastered, white-painted infills. The hipped red tile roof is pierced by a chimney.

=== Wildersgade 43 ===
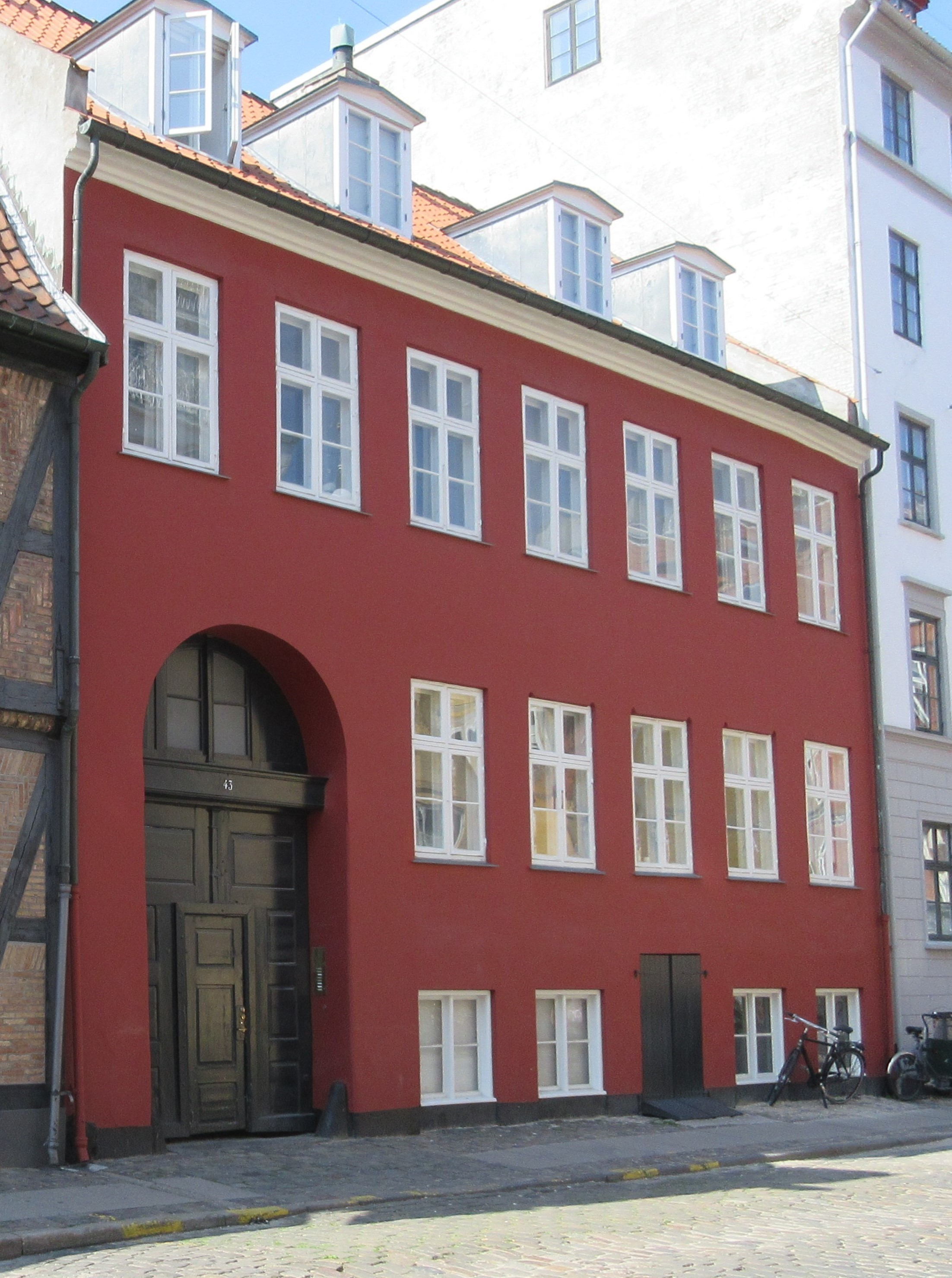
Wildersgade 43 viewed from the street

Wildersgade 43 is constructed with two storeys over a walk-out basement and is seven bays wide. The simple plastered facade is painted in a dark red colour, contrasted by the white-painted cornice and white-painted windows. A brown-painted gate in the two bays furthest to the left (southwest) provides access to the courtyard. The basement entrance is located in the fifth bay from the left. The red tile pitched roof features five dormer windows towards the street. The roof ridge is pierced by two chimneys.

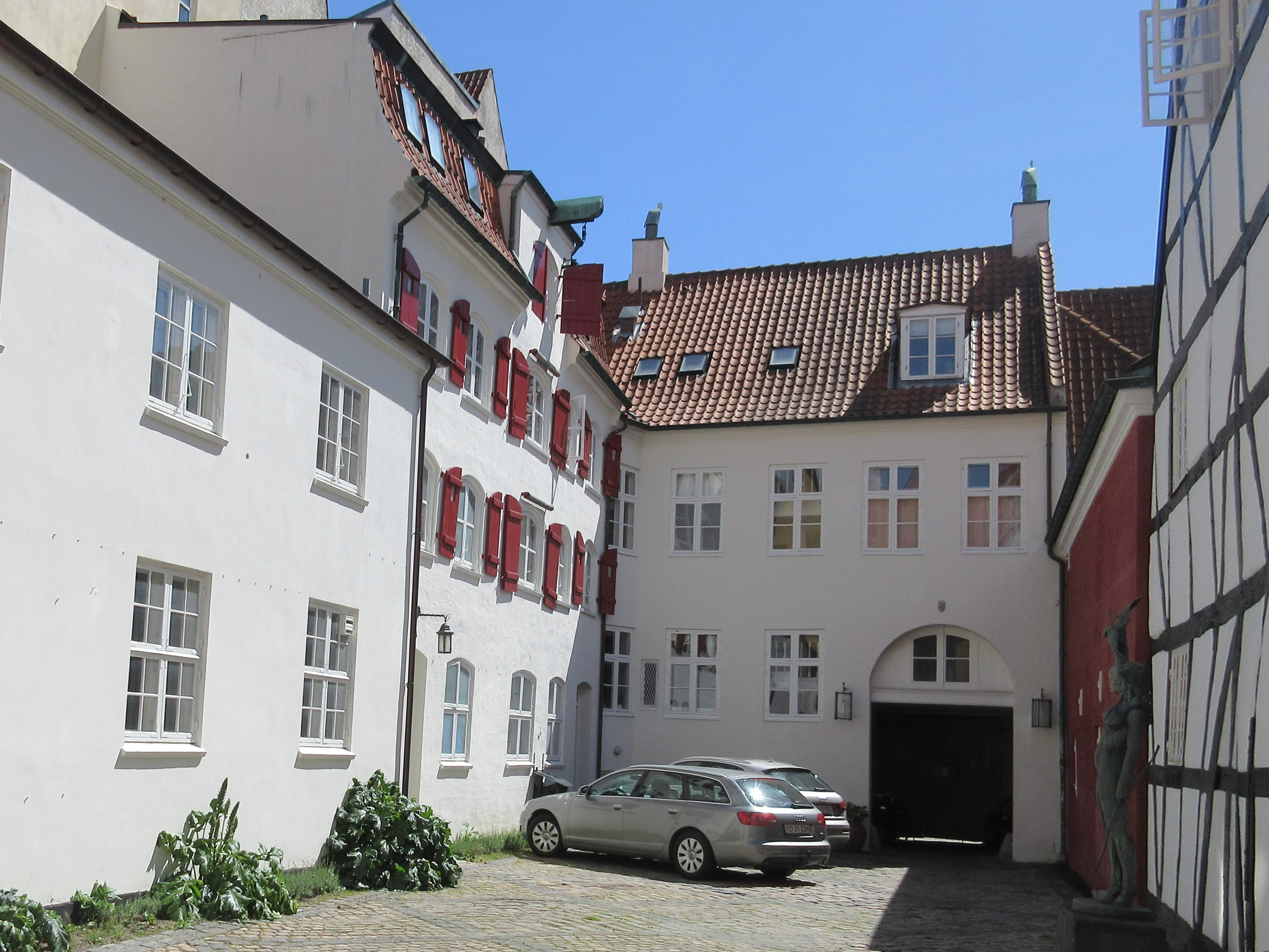
Wildersgade 43 viewed from the yard with the warehouse and a bit of the 20th-century building visible to the left

The rear side of the building is plastered and painted white. A short side wing extends from the rear side of the building along the northeast side of the courtyard. It is followed by a three storeys tall and five bays wide warehouse. The facade of the warehouse is crowned by a gabled wall dormer with a pulley beam.

The warehouse is three storeys tall and five bays wide. The facade is crowned by a gabled wall dormer with a pulley beam. The roof is a monopitched Mansard roof.

== Today ==
Strandgade 30 contains one large apartment on the first floor and office space on the ground floor. Wildersgade 43 contains a single apartment on each of the three floors.

== Cultural references ==
Hammershøi painted some 60 interior paintings from the apartment, including some of his most known works. These include Ida Reading a Letter (1899), Sunbeams (190) and Interior with Young Woman Seen from the Back (1903–04). His paintings from the apartment were showcased by the Ordrupgaard Art Museum in the exhibition Hjemme hos Hammershøi.

In Kvinde set fra ryggen, Jesper Wung-Sung describes Wilhelm and Ida Hammershøi's life in the building as seen from Ida's perspective.

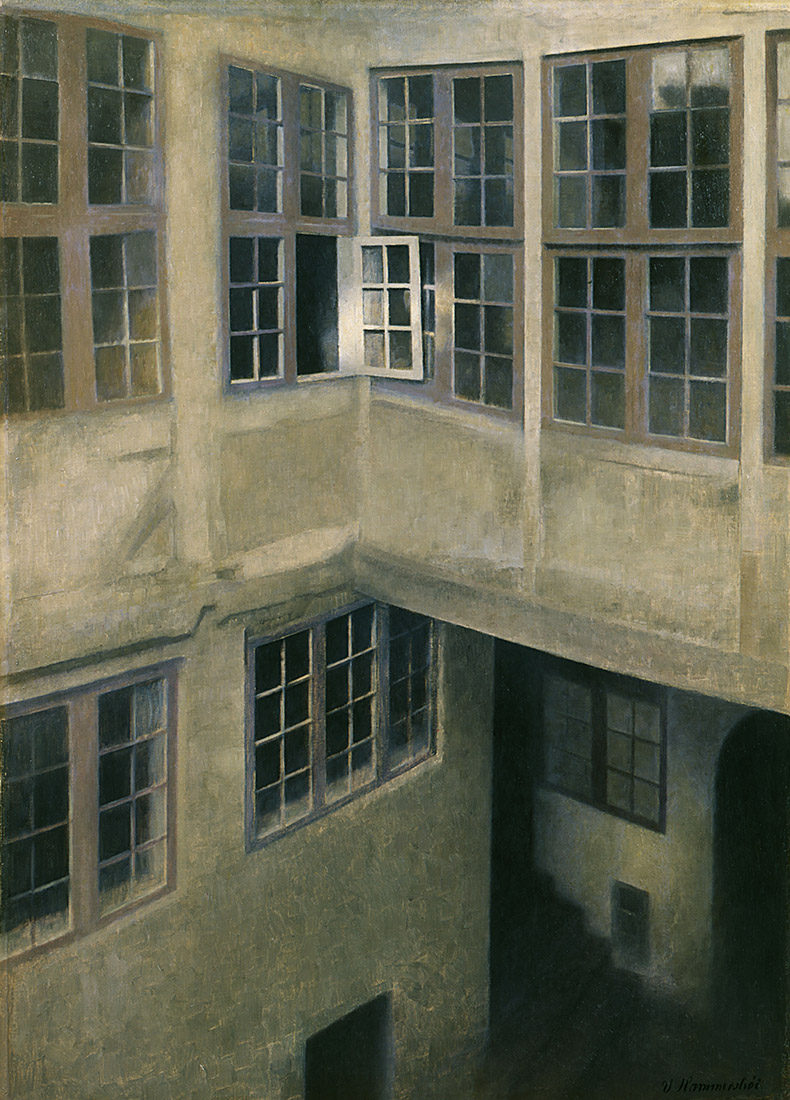
Detail of Strandgade 30 (1899)

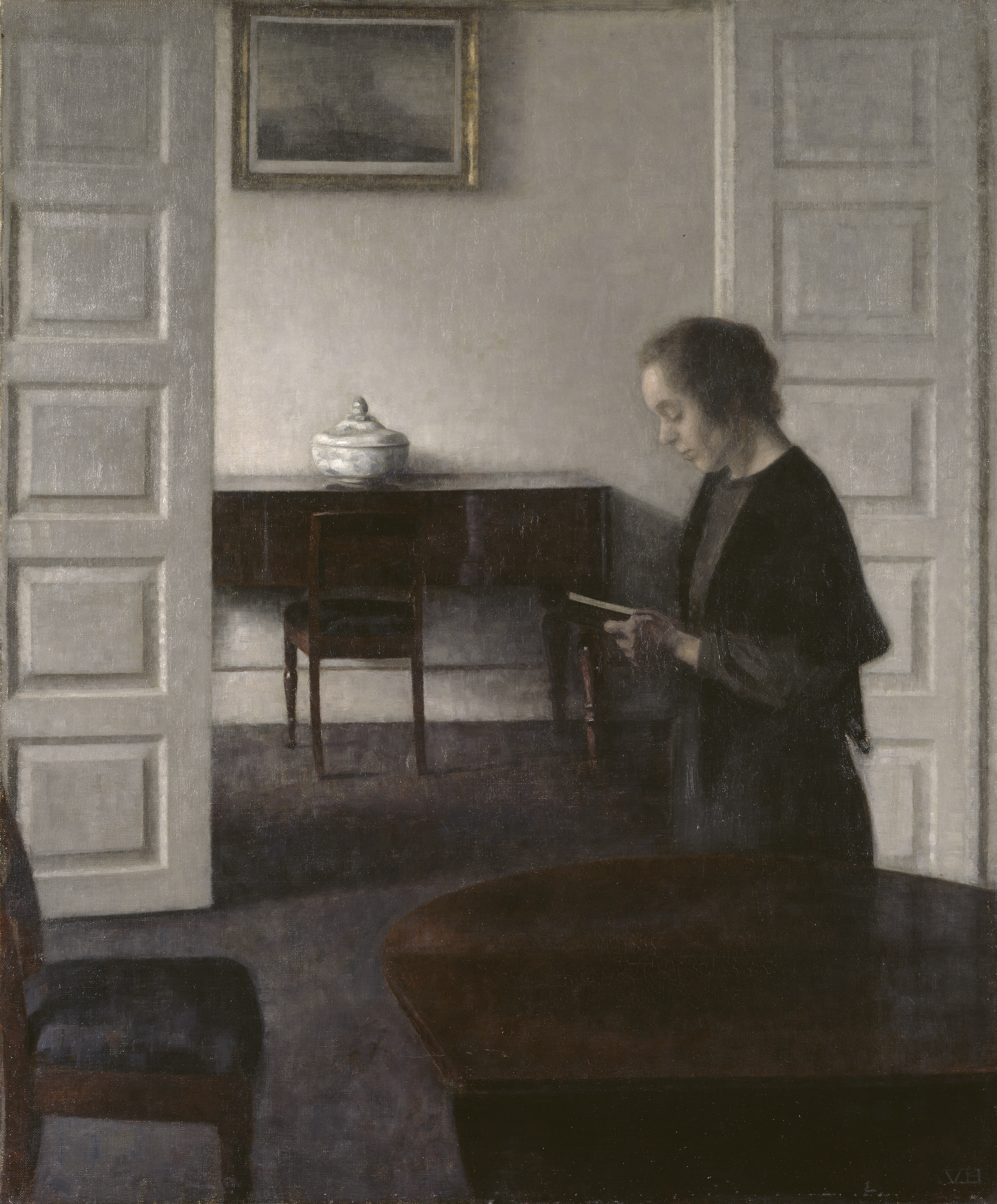
Interior with a Reading Lady, 1900

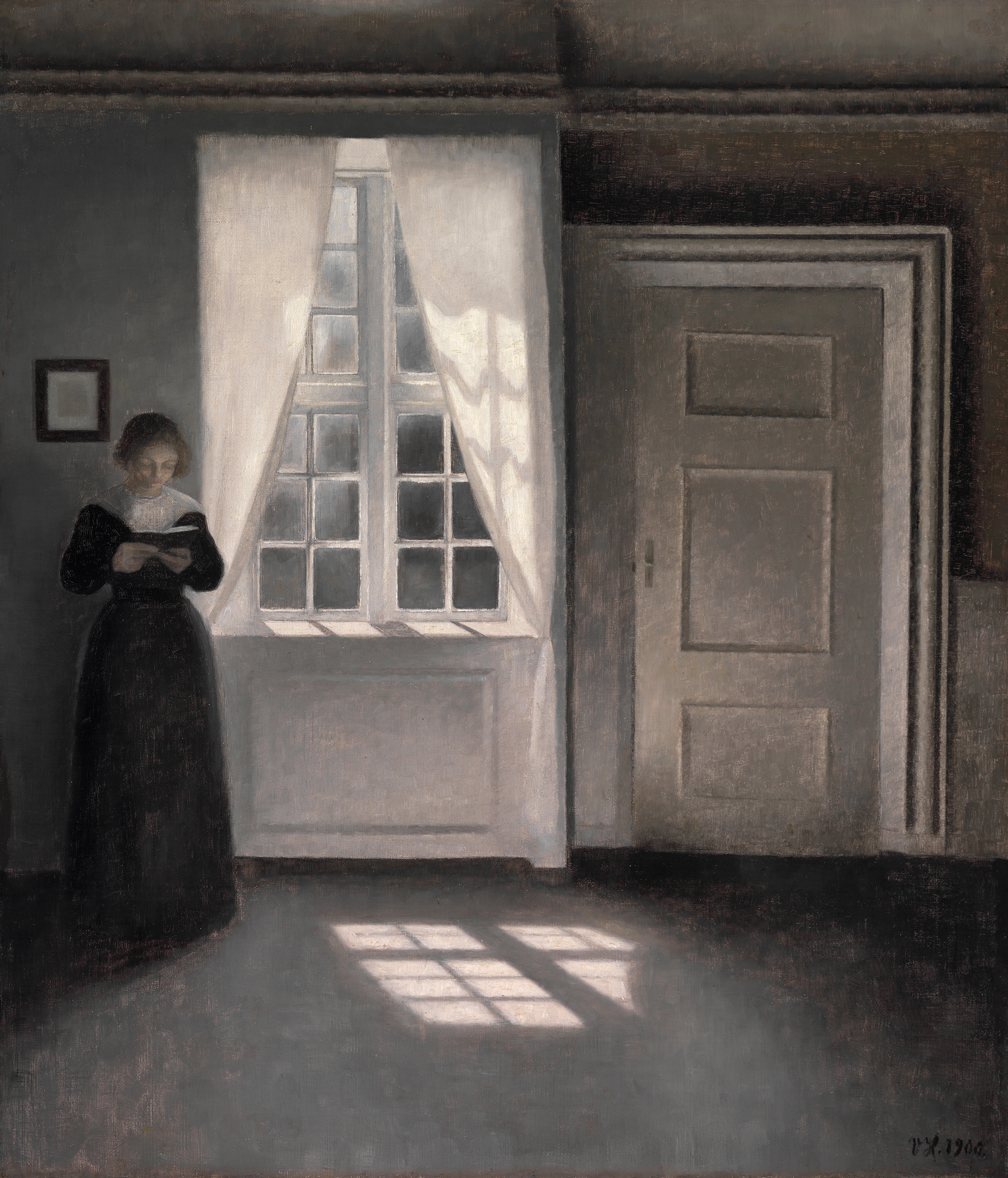
Interior of Strandgade 30

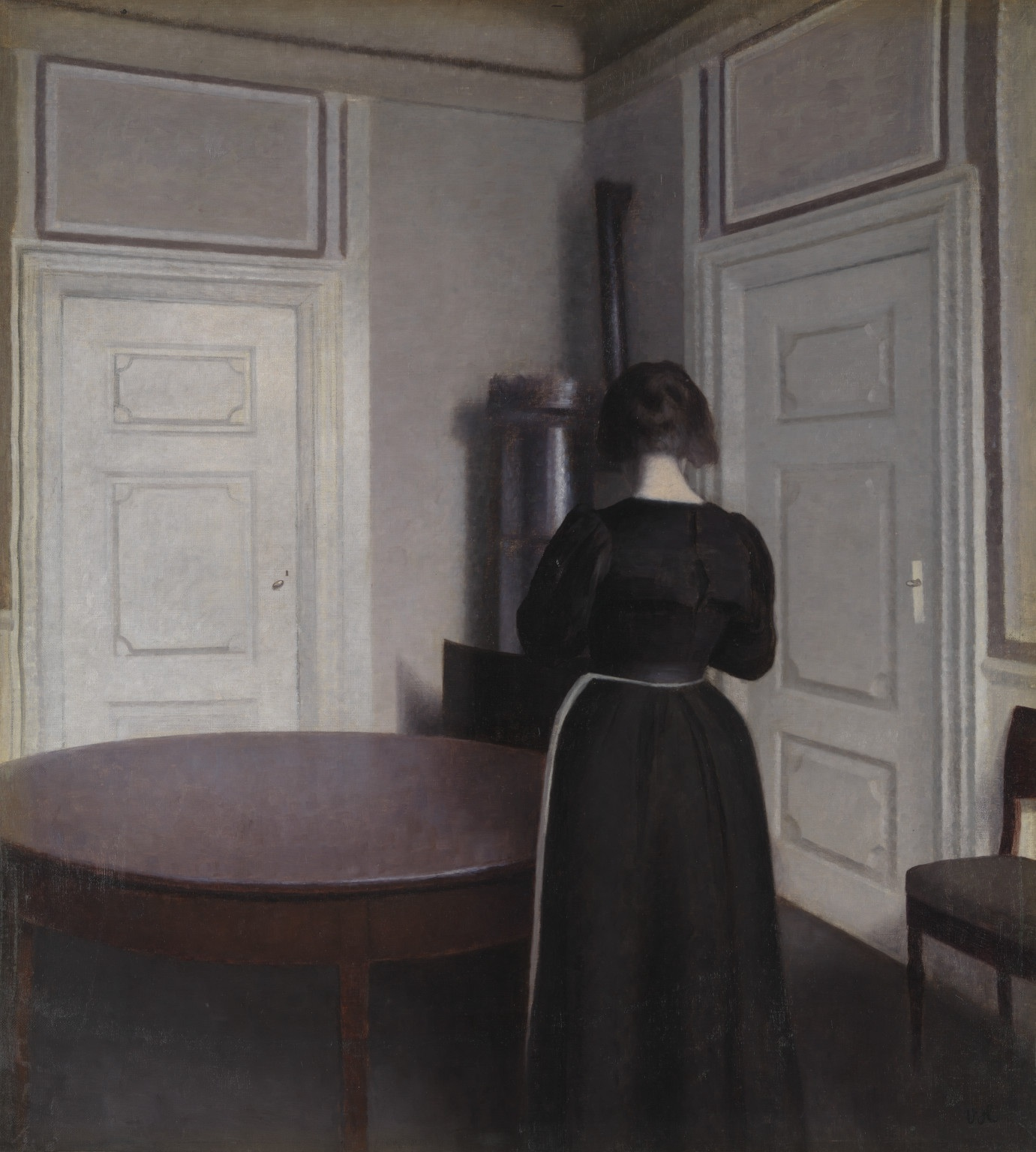
Interior, 1899

Room at Strandgade 30 With Sunshine on the Floor, 10+1

== Gallery ==
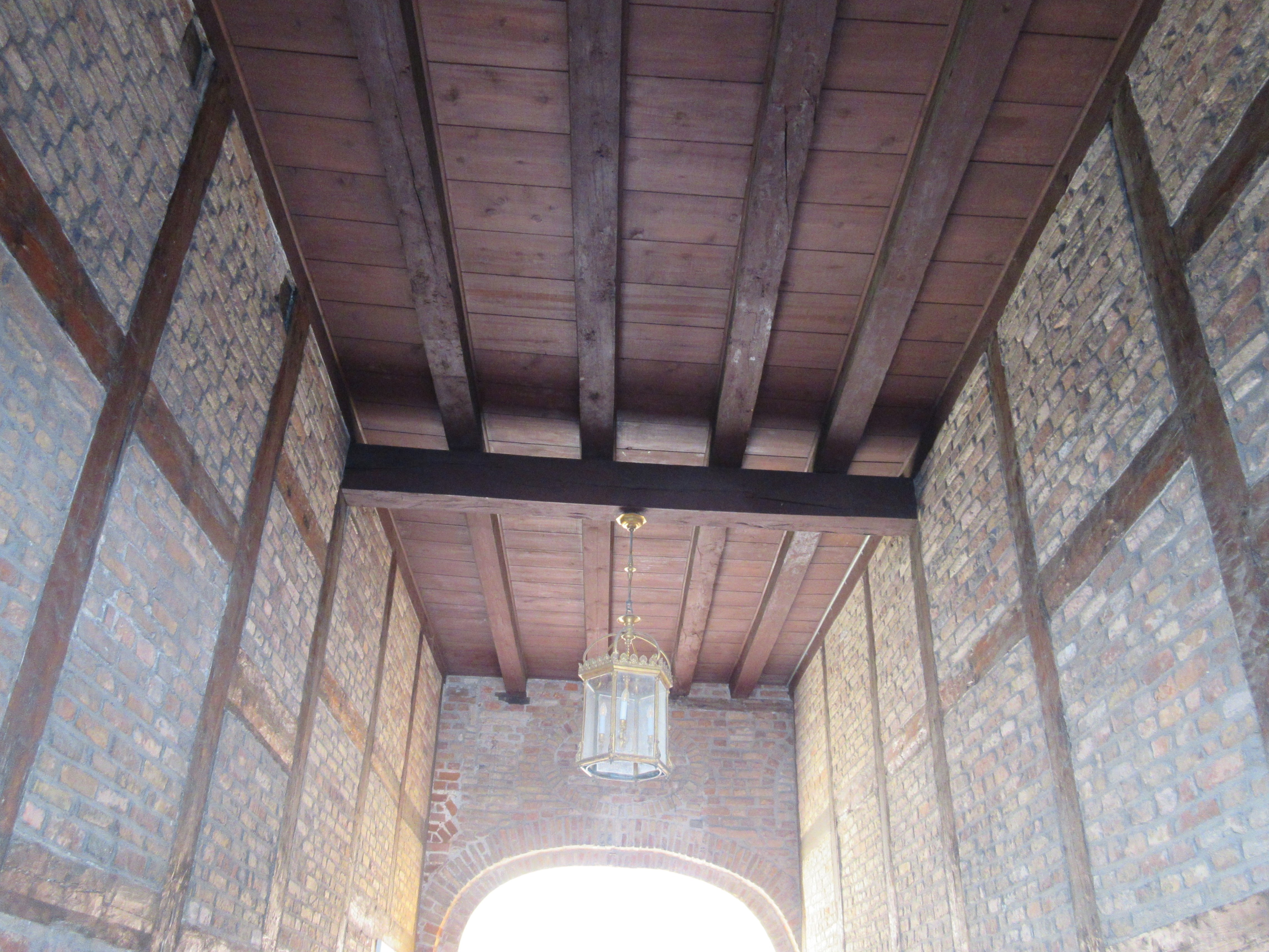
Ceiling of the gateway

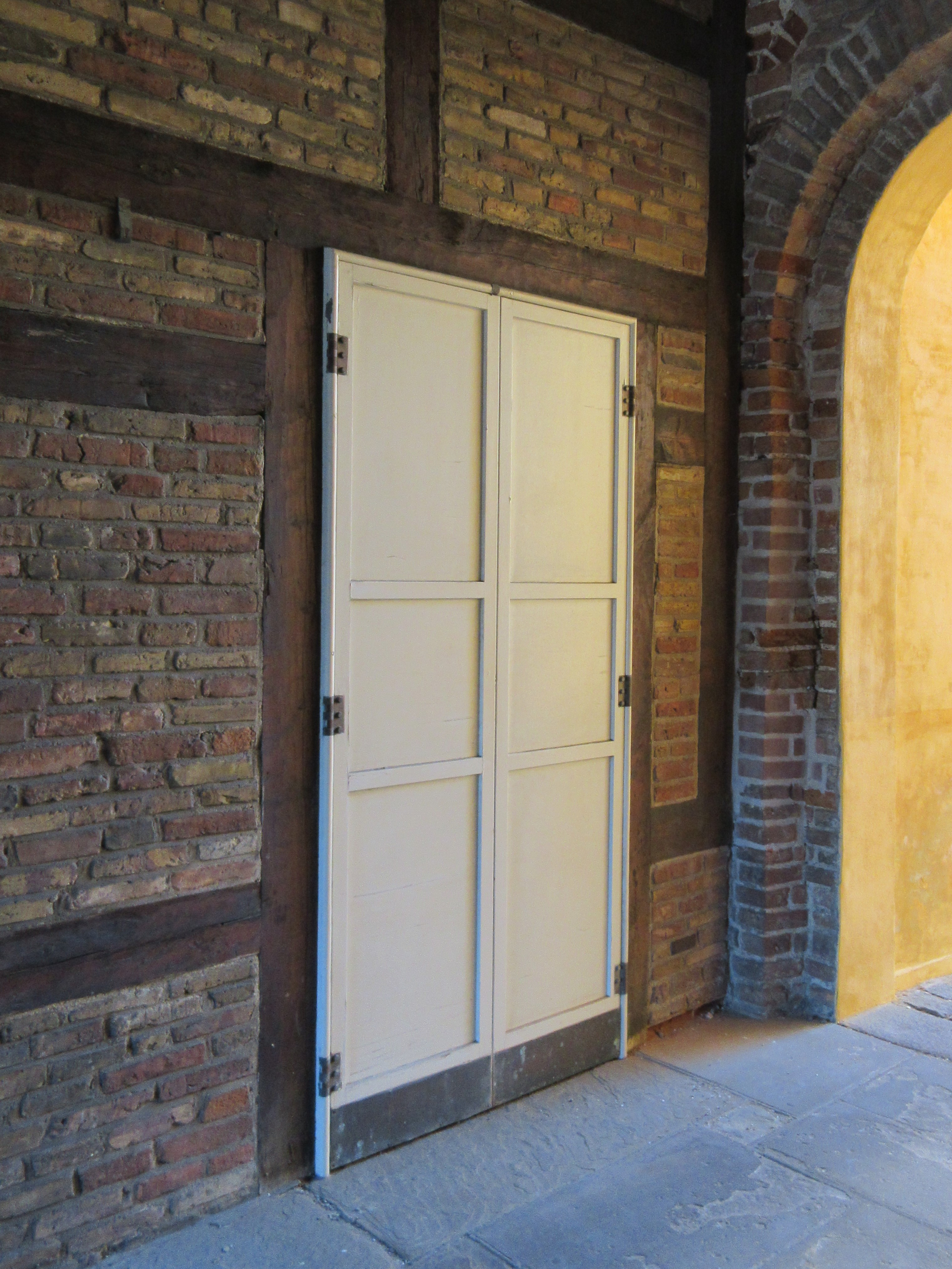
Door in the wall of the gateway

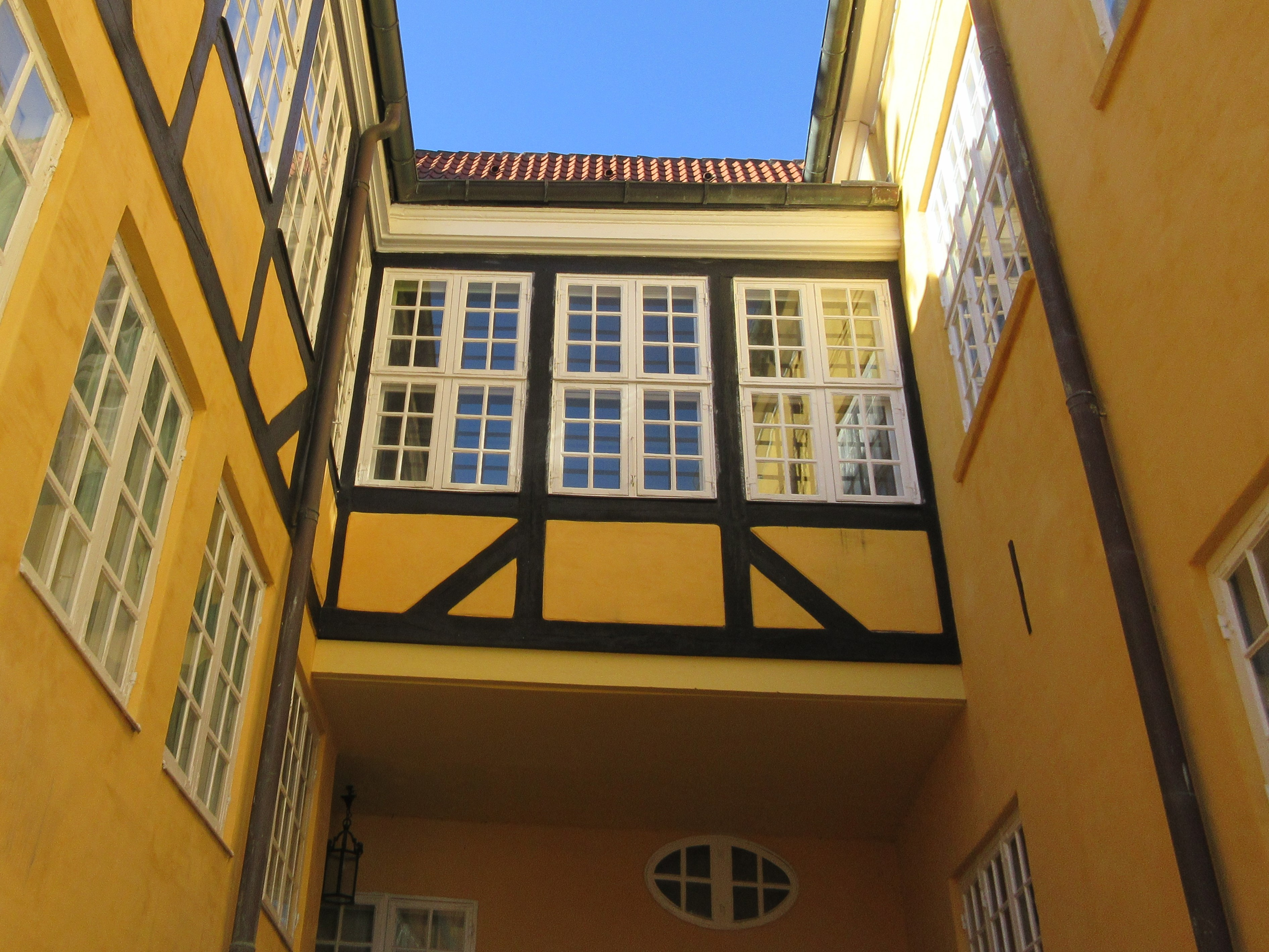
The gallery

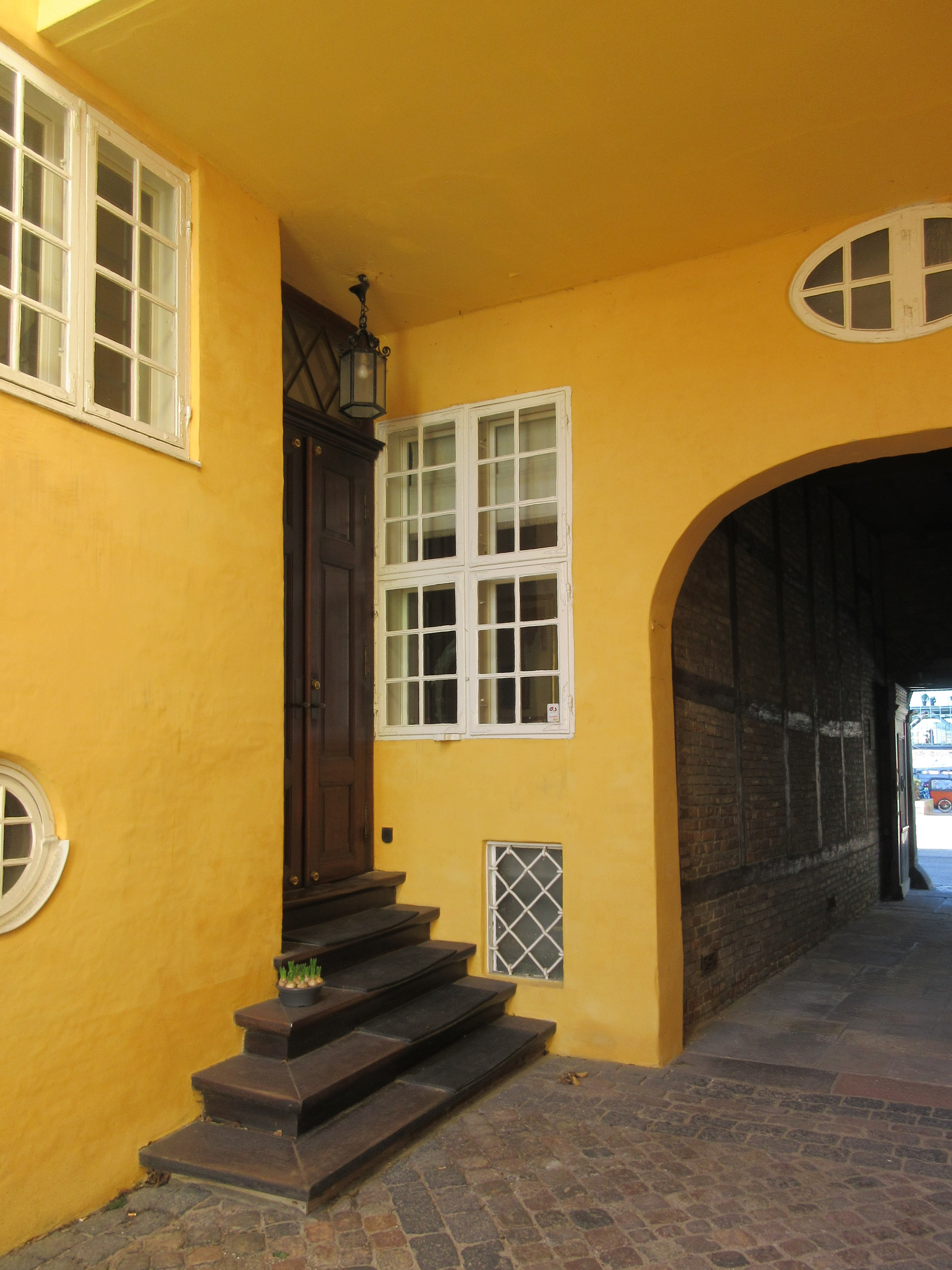
Door in the southwestern side wing

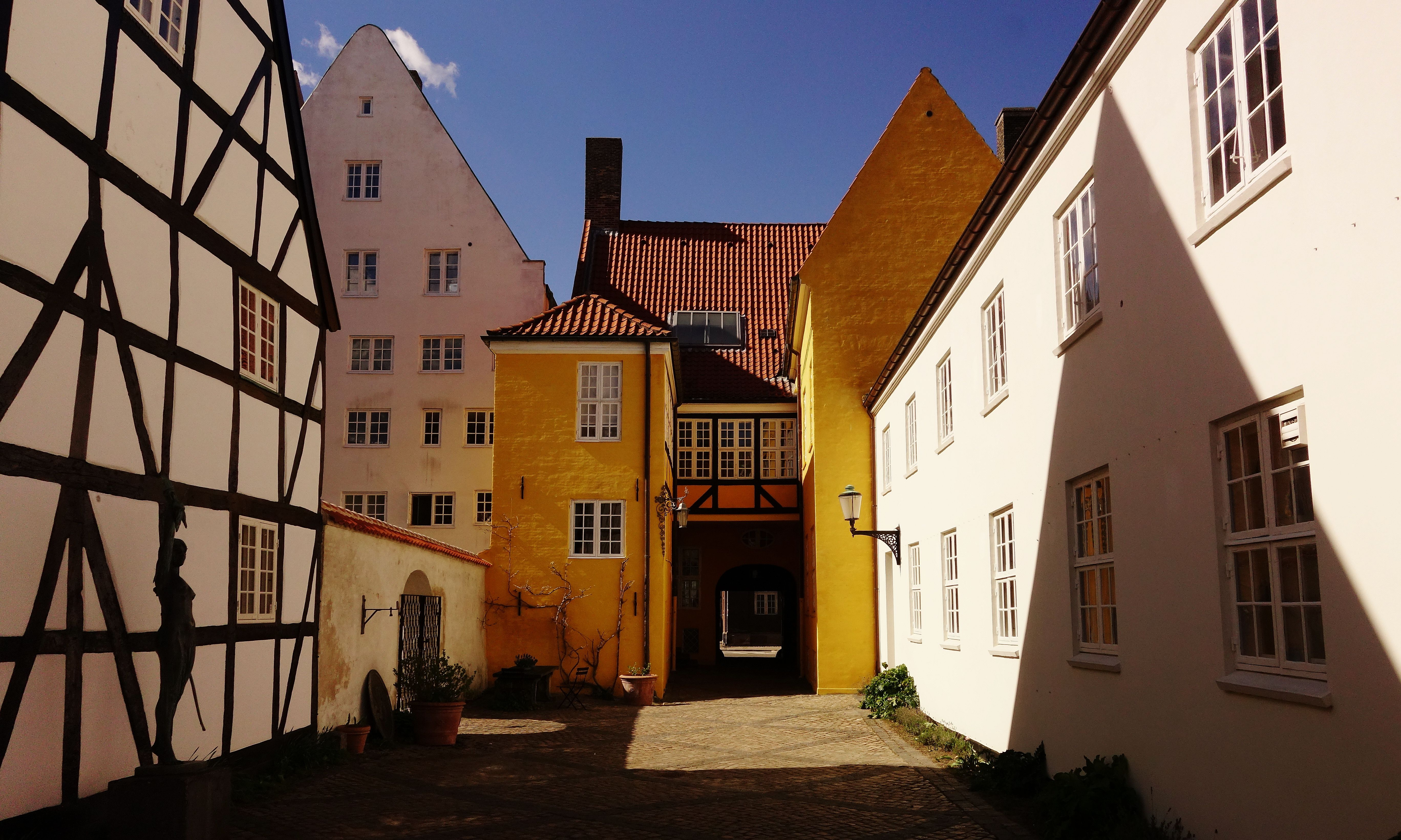
The courtyard, looking towards the street

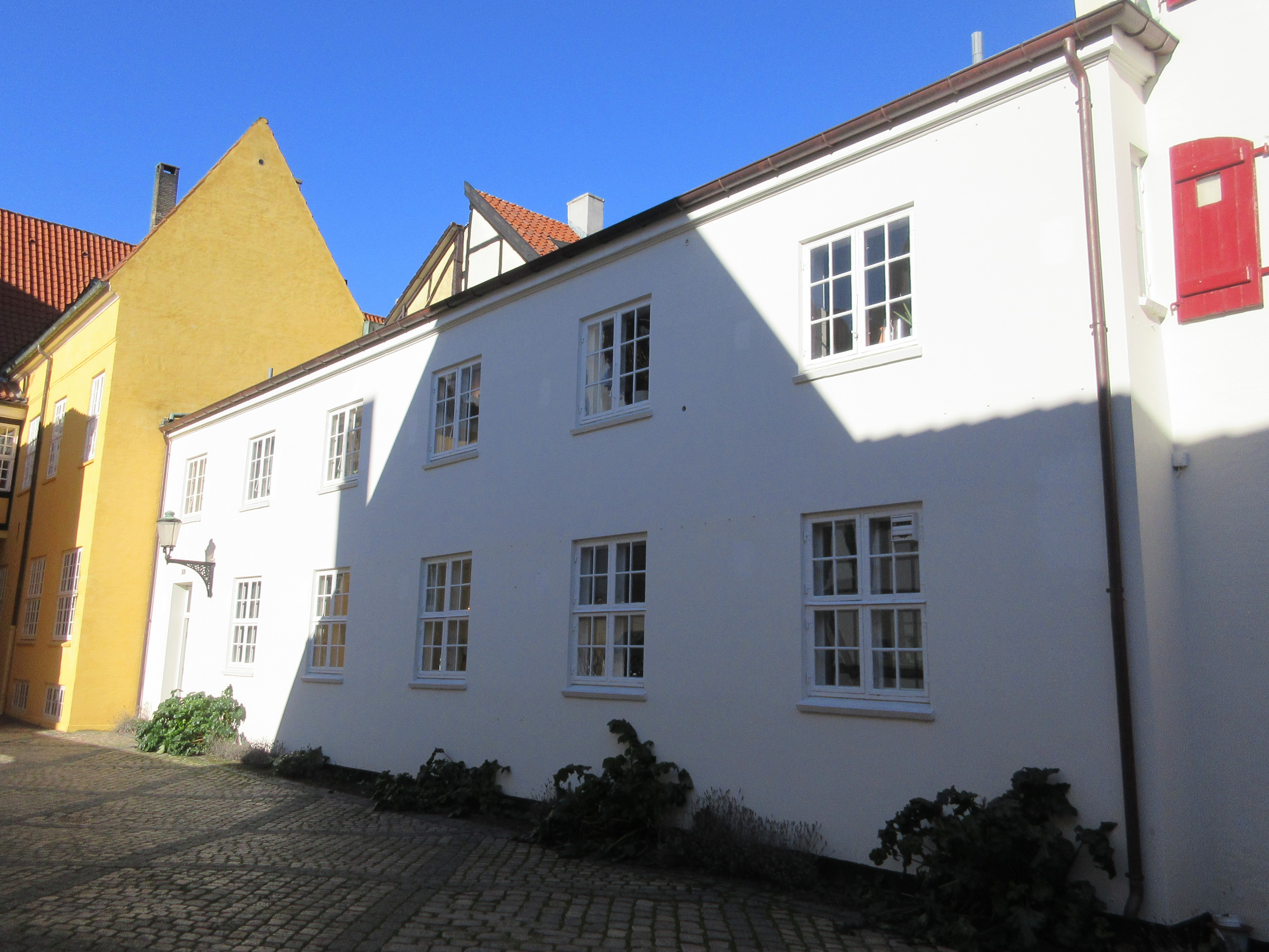
The low building from the 20th century between the northeastern side wing and the warehouse

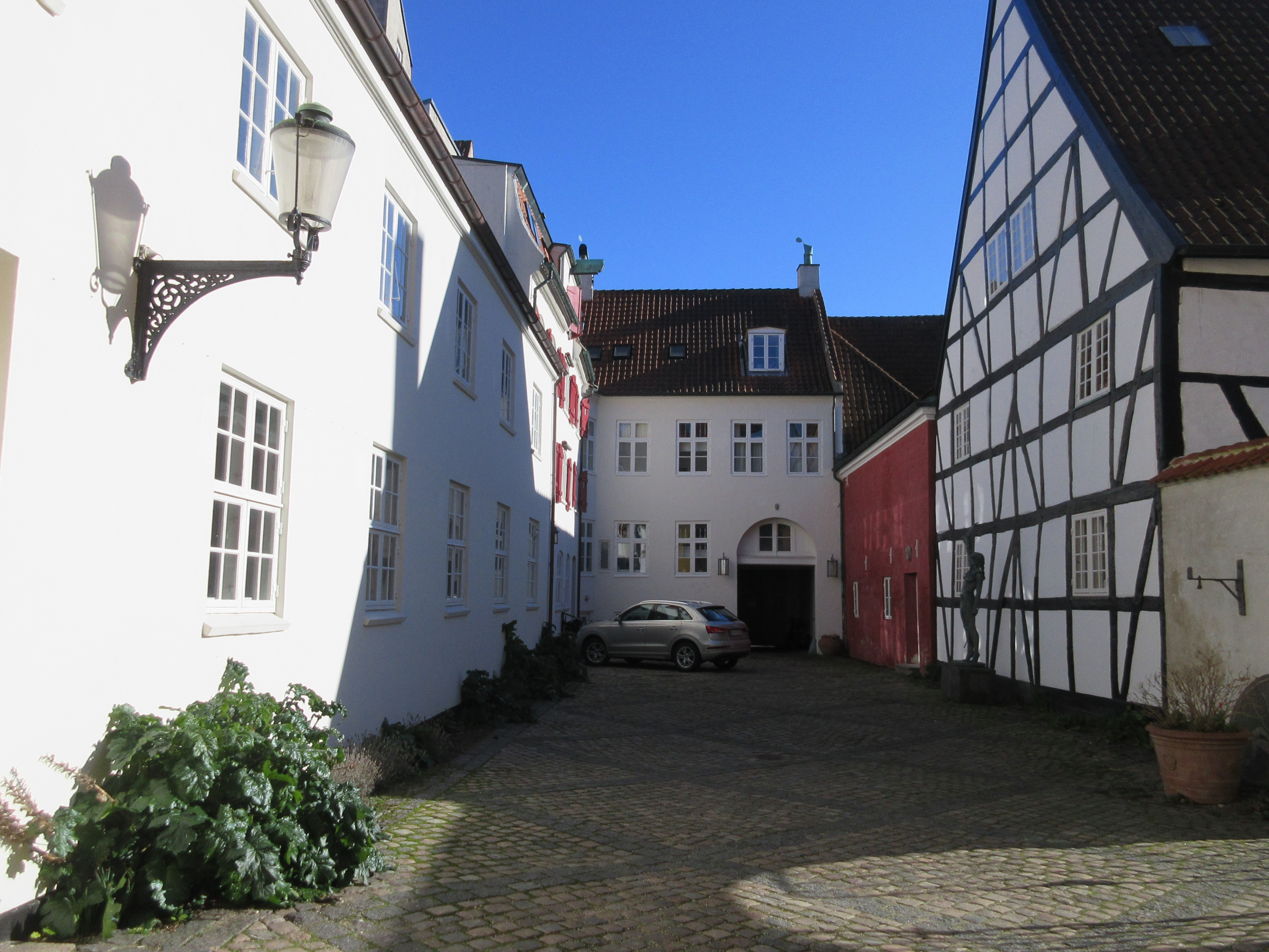
The courtyard, looking towards Wildersgade

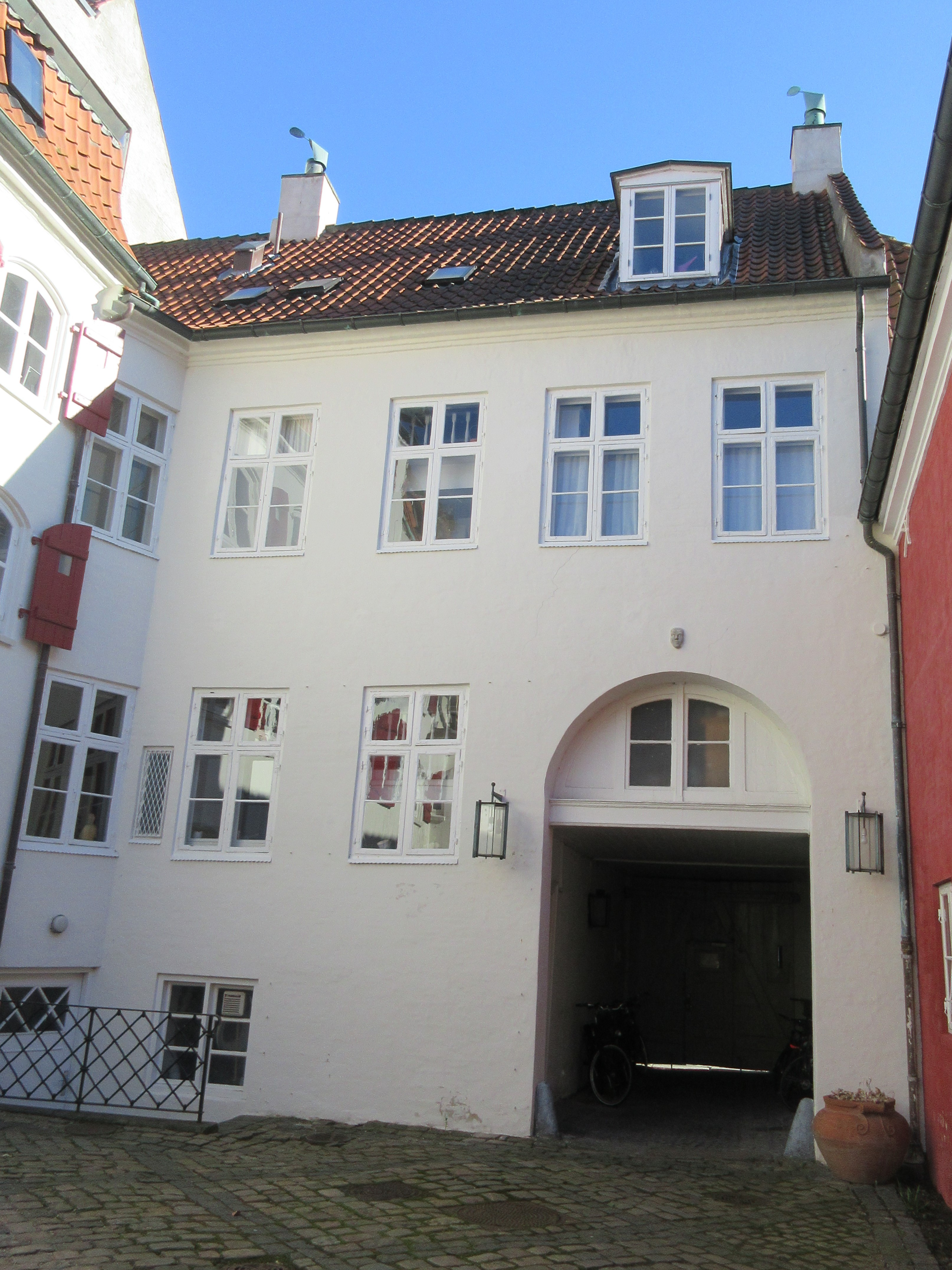
The rear side of Wildersgade 43

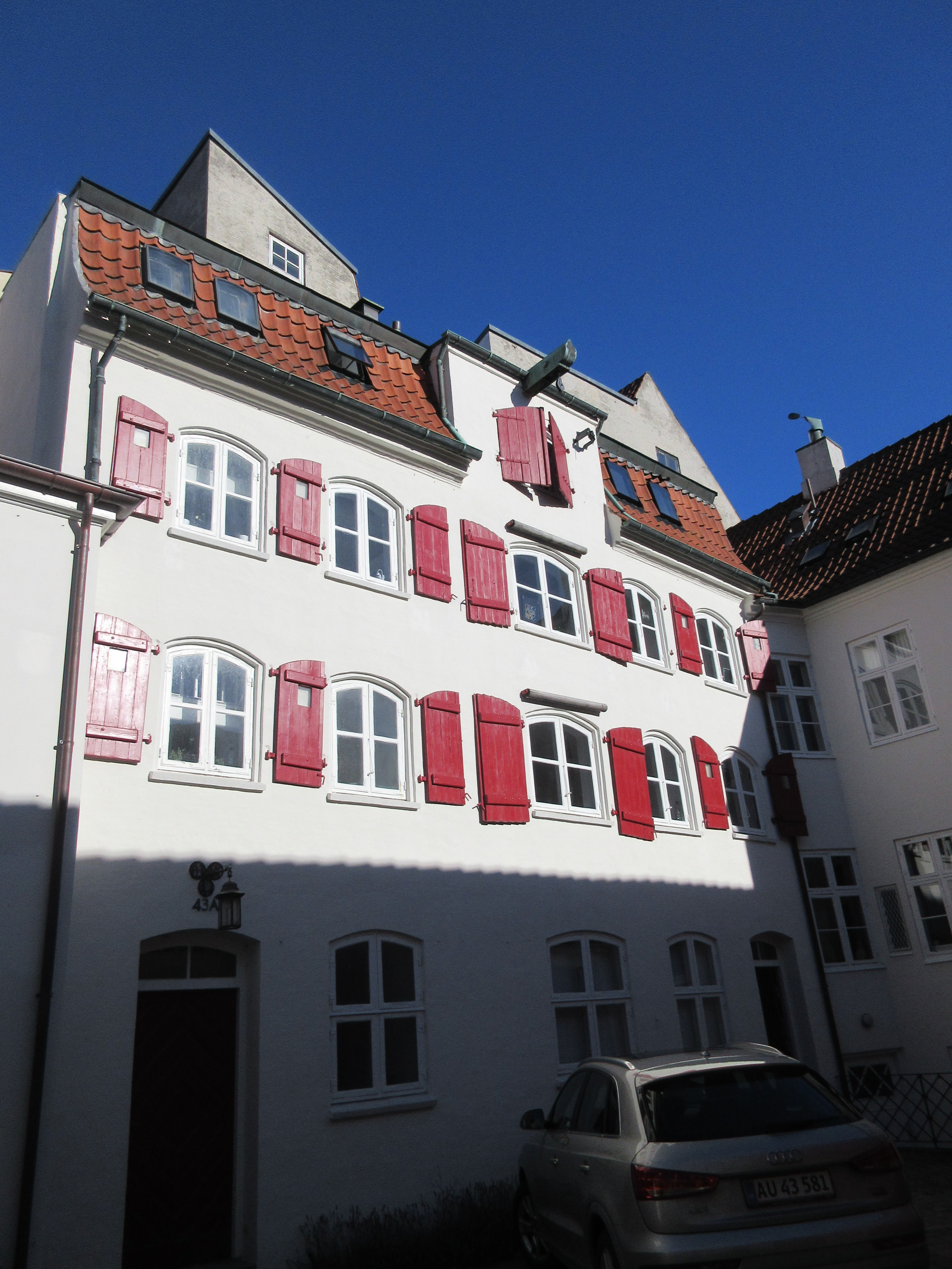
The warehouse

== See also ==
- Kringlegangen
