= Interior with an Easel, Bredgade 25 =

Painting by Vilhelm Hammershøi

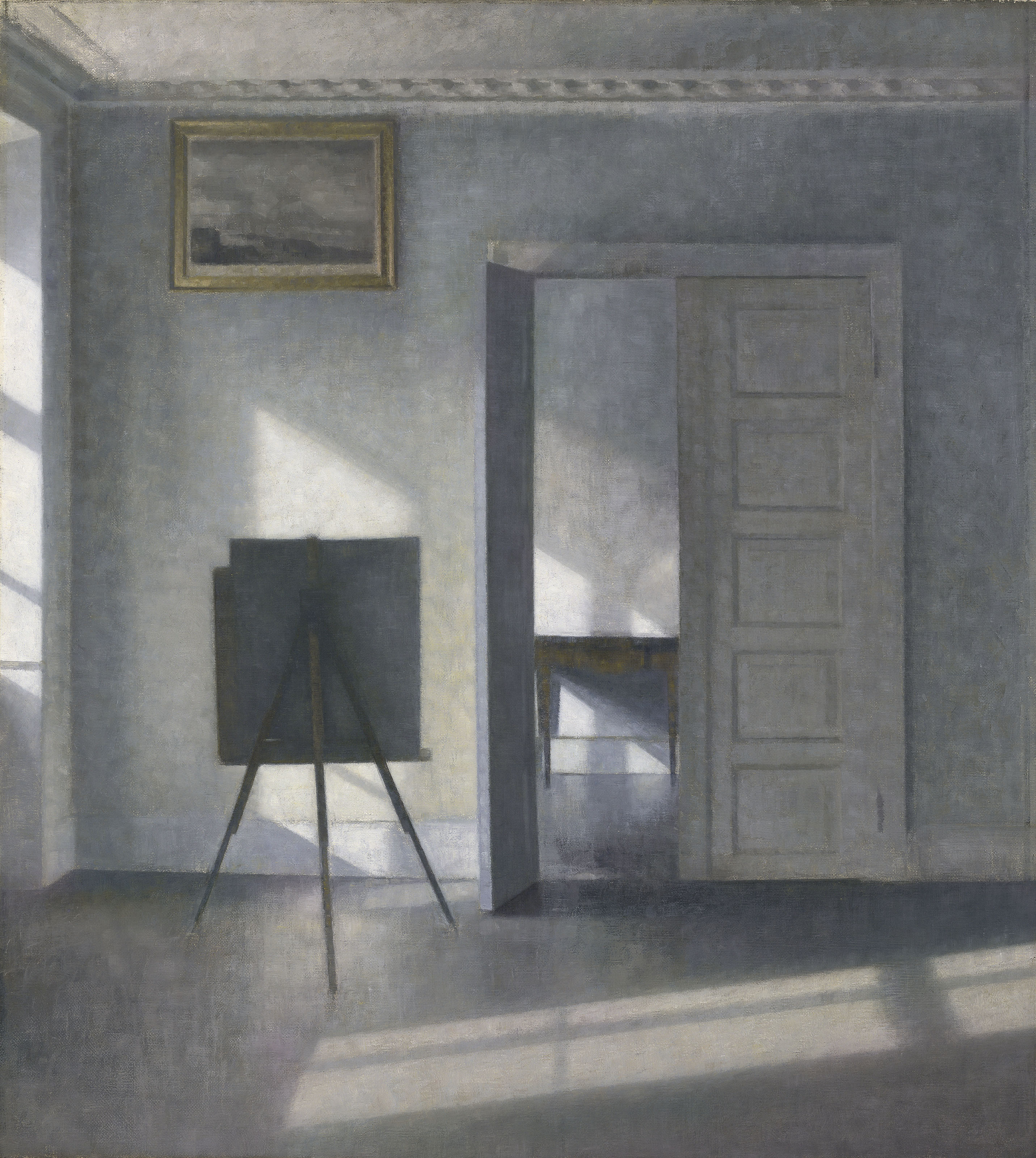
- Artist: Vilhelm Hammershøi
- Year: 1912
- Medium: Oil on canvas
- Dimensions: 78.7 cm × 70.5 cm (31.0 in × 27.8 in)
- Location: Getty Museum, Los Angeles

Interior with an Easel, Bredgade 25 (Danish: Interiør med kunstnerens staffeli, Bredgade 25) is an oil-on-canvas painted by Danish artist Vilhelm Hammershøi in 1912. It was acquired by the Getty Museum, in Los Angeles, in 2018. The painting depicts the artist's apartment at Bredgade 25 in Copenhagen, which was his address up to his death in 1916.

== Description ==
Hammershøi is renowned for his sense of minimalism and his color palettes which consist of muted neutral colors, which consist of greys, desaturated yellows, greens, etc. His minimalism is also a major component of Scandinavian design, and many of his works is representative to this aesthetic, in addition to emphasis on natural lighting.

Interior with an Easel, Bredgade 25 is one of four paintings that depicts Hammershøi's easel. There are two other variants that feature the apartment in addition with the easel. A 1910 painting of the same subject is located in Statens Museum for Kunst, which features a chair between the easel and the wall in addition to a porcelain bowl without a lid on the table visible in the back room. Another variant, which was undated features a chair but with a covered porcelain bowl in the background, was featured at a Sotheby's auction in 1975.

This variant is sparse in nature, which features the easel, a small side table half visible with one of the doors open, and a gilt.

=== Provenance ===
The painting was sold from the artist to Leonard Borwick in 1912, who was an enthusiast of Hammershøi's work.

It was then acquired from Borwick to Adam Black in 1912. Passed on by descent, it was sold at Christie's European Art Auction on 31 October 2018, where it was sold to the Getty Museum for US$5,037,500, making it the most expensive Danish art piece, which initially had an estimate of $1.5–2.0 million. The museum purchased it through Jack Kilgore & Co.

Getty Museum Director Timothy Potts stated: "We are delighted to be able to add this extraordinary work by one of the most important Scandinavian artists of the late 19th and early 20th centuries to our collection." and "Hammershøi clearly saw himself in the tradition of old master painters (he is often touted as ‘the modern Vermeer’), and I am sure visitors will see many resonances with paintings by other great northern European artists, such as Caspar David Friedrich, Edvard Munch."
