= Interior with Young Woman Seen from the Back =

Painting by Vilhelm Hammershøi

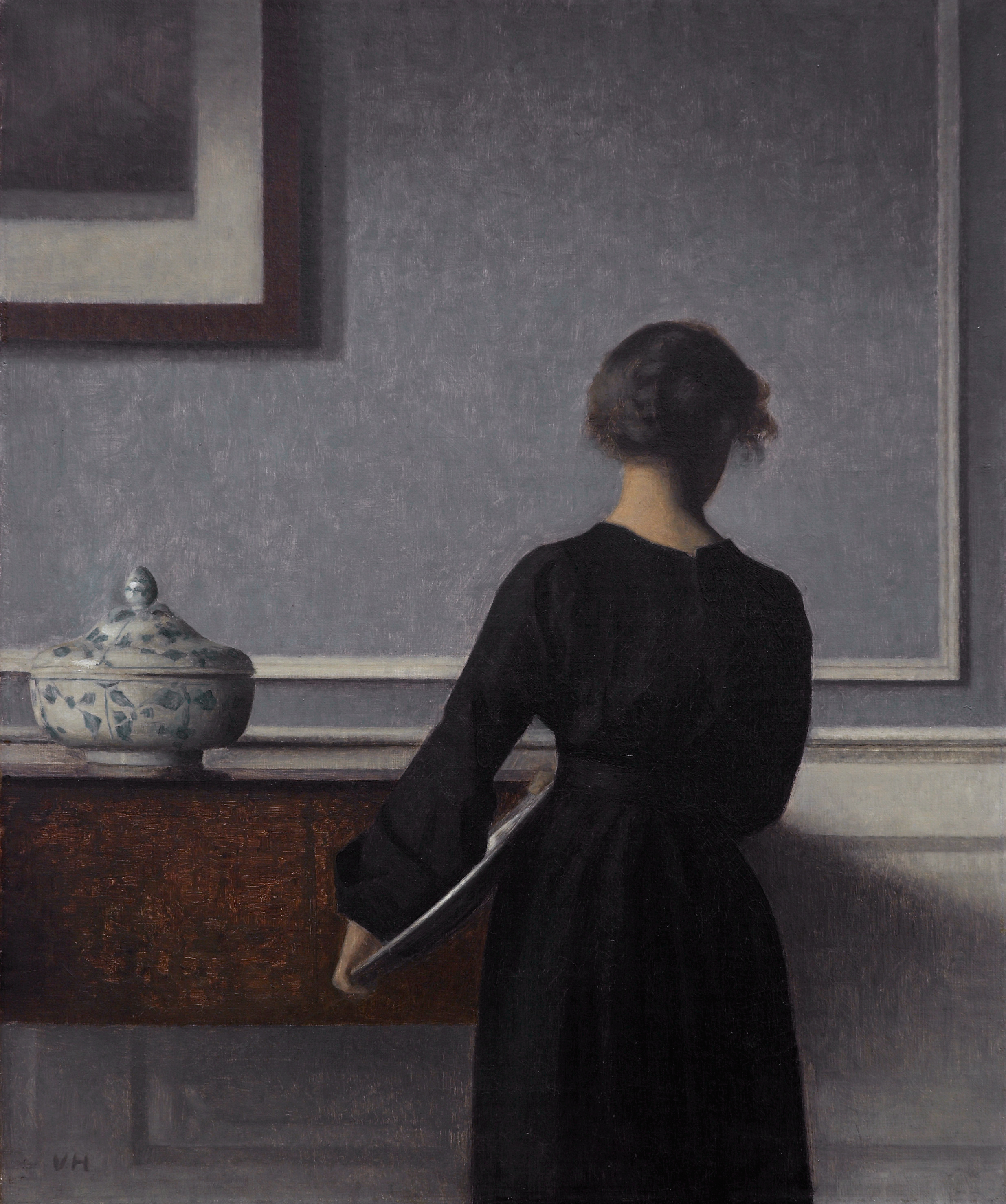
Interior with Young Woman Seen from the Back (c. 1903–04), 60.5 x 50.5 cm

Interior with Young Woman Seen from the Back (Danish: Interiør med ung kvinde set fra ryggen) is an oil-on-canvas painting from c. 1903–04 by the Danish artist Vilhelm Hammershøi. It is now held in the Randers Museum of Art. It uses the muted grey-blue palette, uncluttered composition and detailed attention to the play of light typical of Hammershøi's work.

== Description ==
The young woman featured is Hammershøi's wife, Ida, whom he painted frequently with her back turned. Michael Palin, an admirer of Hammershøi's work, believes that Ida is often depicted facing away since, in the portraits in which she is facing the viewer, her face reveals "a troubled soul"; and that maybe Hammershøi painted her in structured, minimalist interiors as a response to an emotionally fraught domestic life. Palin admits that this is only conjecture, but is fascinated by the feeling of secrecy produced by presenting subjects with their back to the viewer. Felix Krämer, writing when the Kunsthalle Hamburg held the first German Hammershøi retrospective in 2003, felt that the recurrent back-to-the-viewer theme provoked "a feeling of aloofness" in the viewer.

Hans Edvard Nørregård-Nielsen notes how the subject who is leaning towards the right is offset by the platter she is holding on her hip. The effect is achieved with strong brush-strokes which provide a balancing contrast with the blue and white tureen in the left half of the picture. It serves to concentrate the viewer's attention on the pretty nape of her neck, highlighted between the demure black dress and the simple tight braid of her hair. It has also been noted that the portrait is a good example of light and shade. Ida's dark hair contrasts with the fair skin on her neck with light coming in from the left, while her black clothing stands out against the pale background, while the play of light and shadow on the folds of her dress adds depth to the otherwise flat character of the painting.

=== Scandinavian design ===
The furniture and decoration shown is in Hammershøi's own apartment on Strandgade in Copenhagen which was decorated in the simple minimalist style now recognised as "Scandinavian design", but which, at the time, was in stark contrast to the 19th-century penchant for elaborate, heavy and cluttered decoration.
