= Støvkornenes dans i solstrålerne =

Painting by Vilhelm Hammershøi

Dust Motes Dancing in Sunbeams
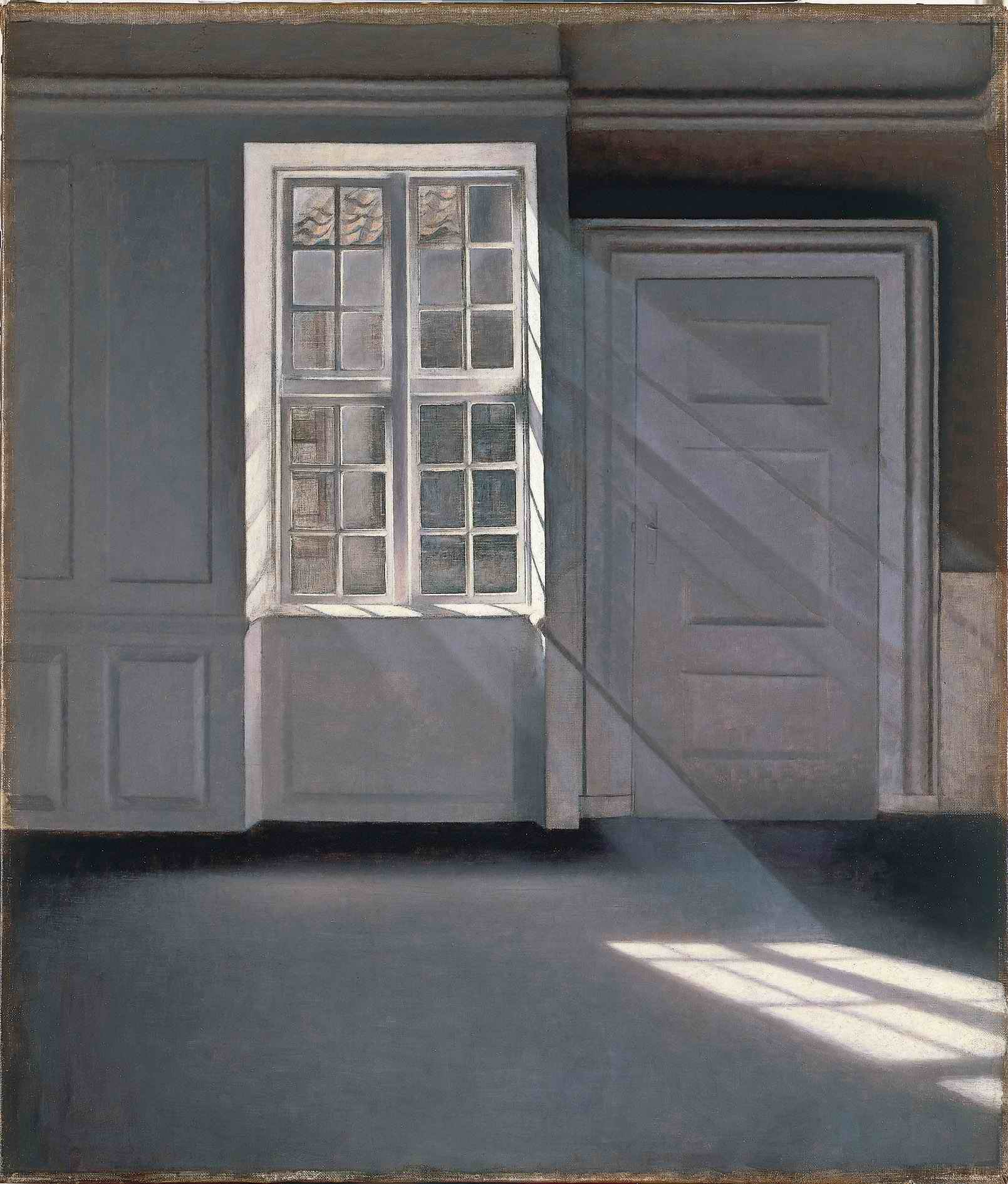
- Artist: Vilhelm Hammershøi
- Year: 1900
- Medium: Oil on canvas
- Dimensions: 70 cm × 59 cm (28 in × 23 in)
- Location: Ordrupgaard, Copenhagen

Støvkornenes dans i solstrålerne (English: Dust Motes Dancing in Sunbeams), also Solstråler (English: Sunbeams), is an oil painting from 1900 by the Danish Symbolist painter Vilhelm Hammershøi. Considered to be one of the masterpieces of Danish culture, it was included in the 2006 Danish Culture Canon.

== Title ==
When he exhibited the painting, Hammershøi called it Solskin (sunshine) or Solstråler (sunbeams). It was only later it was given the more poetic title of Støvkornenes dans i solstrålerne. It is displayed in the Ordrupgaard Museum.

== Description ==
The painting presents an empty room in Hammershøi's 17th-century apartment in the Christianshavn district of Copenhagen. The bare panelled walls, without any furnishings or decorations, are illuminated by rays of winter sunlight shining through the window, a pattern of light and shade falling on the wooden floor.

The central feature of the work is the recessed window, through which shafts of dust-filled light shine diagonally down into the greyness of the room. The lack of colour is typical of Hammershøi. The overall impression is that the painting portrays a dark, silent psychological space although in fact the room was located in a busy part of the city, close to the noise of docks and factories.

Like many of his contemporaries, Hammershøi used photography as a basis for his works. This is also the case here. Indeed, the painting conveys the impression of a black and white photograph with all the intermediate greys while the dusty rays of sunlight give the room a highly poetic look. As in the paintings of the Romantic period, the window can be seen as a symbol of longing and dreaming, connecting the room's interior with the world outside, juxtaposing near and far.
