= Ida Reading a Letter =

Painting by Vilhelm Hammershøi

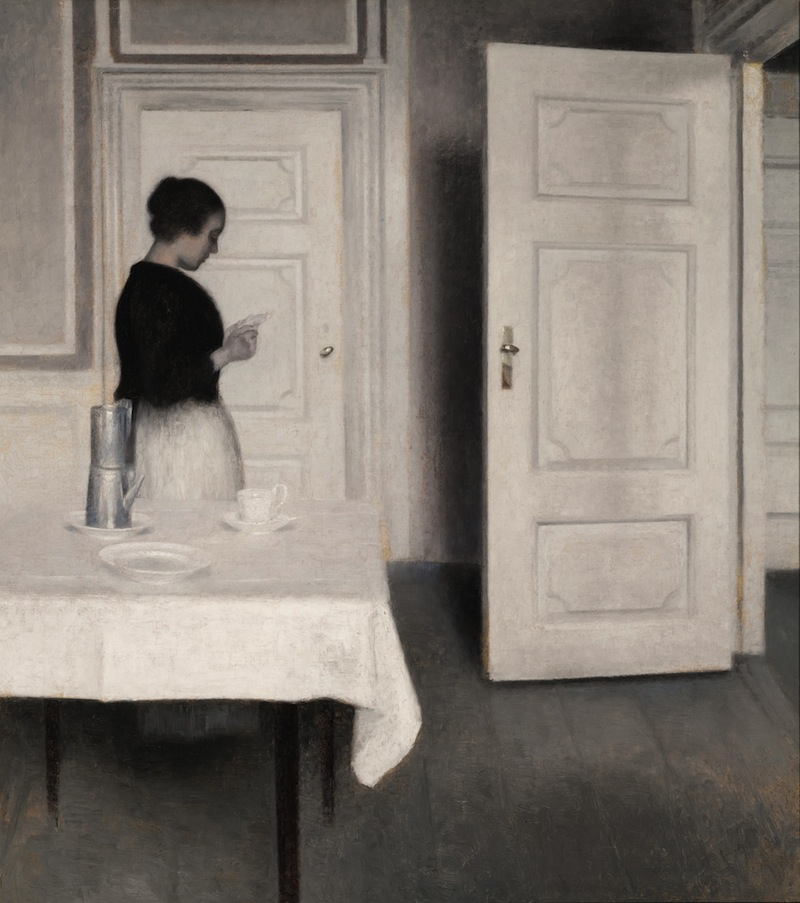
- Artist: Vilhelm Hammershøi
- Year: 1899
- Medium: oil paint, canvas
- Dimensions: 66 cm (26 in) × 59 cm (23 in)

Ida Reading a Letter is an 1899 oil-on-canvas painting by the Danish artist Vilhelm Hammershøi. It is an example of a work inspired by Dutch Golden Age painting and is currently in a private collection.

== Early history and creation ==
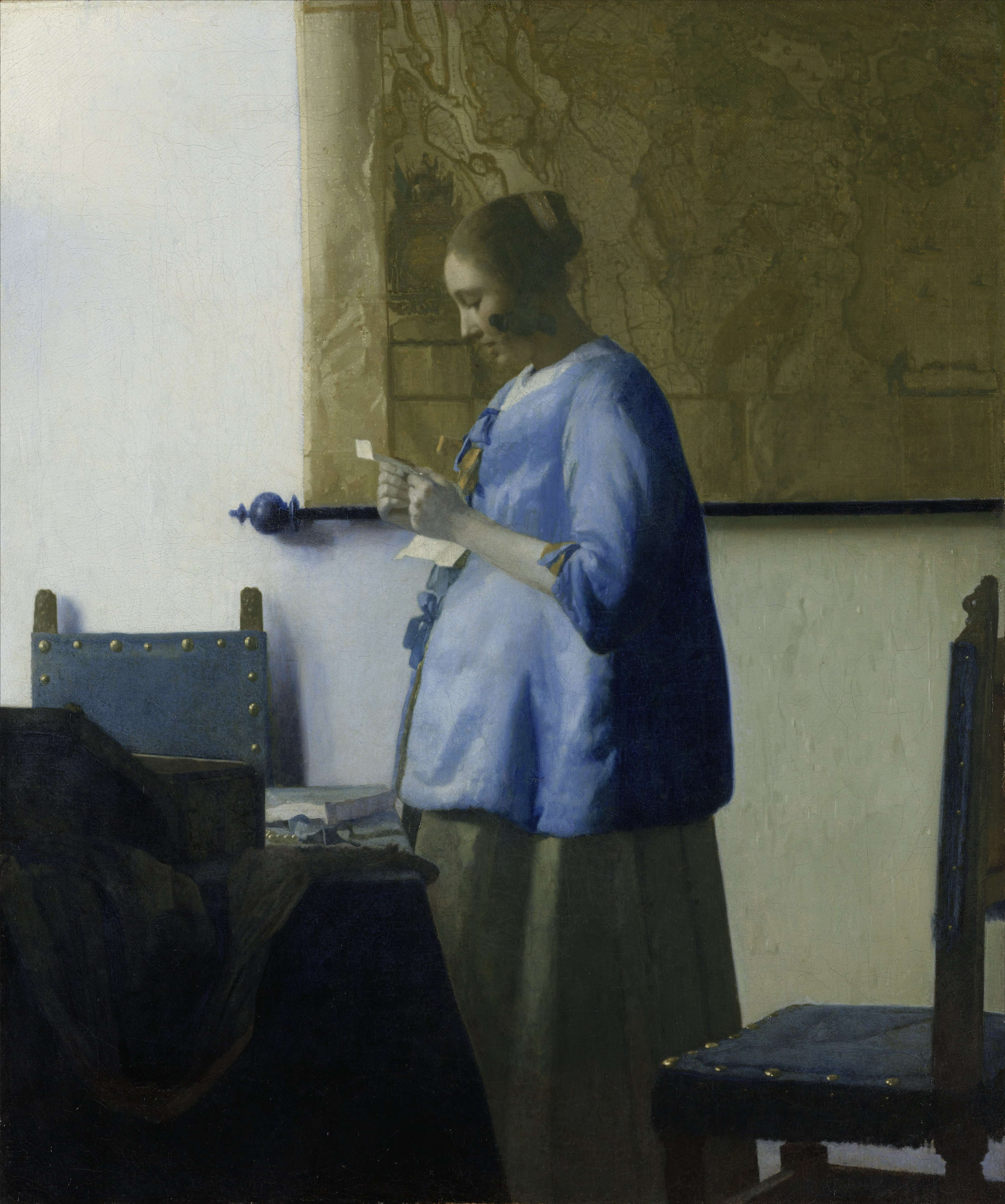
Woman in Blue Reading a Letter

In 1887, Hammershoi travelled to the Netherlands, where he saw first-hand works by Dutch 17th-century master Johannes Vermeer and his Delft contemporaries. This painting shows many characteristics of Vermeer's interiors, usually featuring a woman at an everyday task. This painting seems to have been directly inspired by a Vermeer he must have seen in Amsterdam, Woman in Blue Reading a Letter. The artist use of a similar hairstyle, pose, table and indirect light all recall this painting, and the reduction of household items to a minimum of objects is typical of the 17th-century Dutch interiors. This painting was painted a year after Hammershoi moved into his apartment at Strandgade 30, in Copenhagen.

== Description and interpretation ==
The work shows the artist's wife Ida reading a letter. She is standing near a table laid with a double coffee pot and one cup. The table, the closed door behind her and the open door in her front, all serve to anchor her position in a otherwise gray space. These and other architectural elements of this apartment were often painted by Hammershoi during this period.

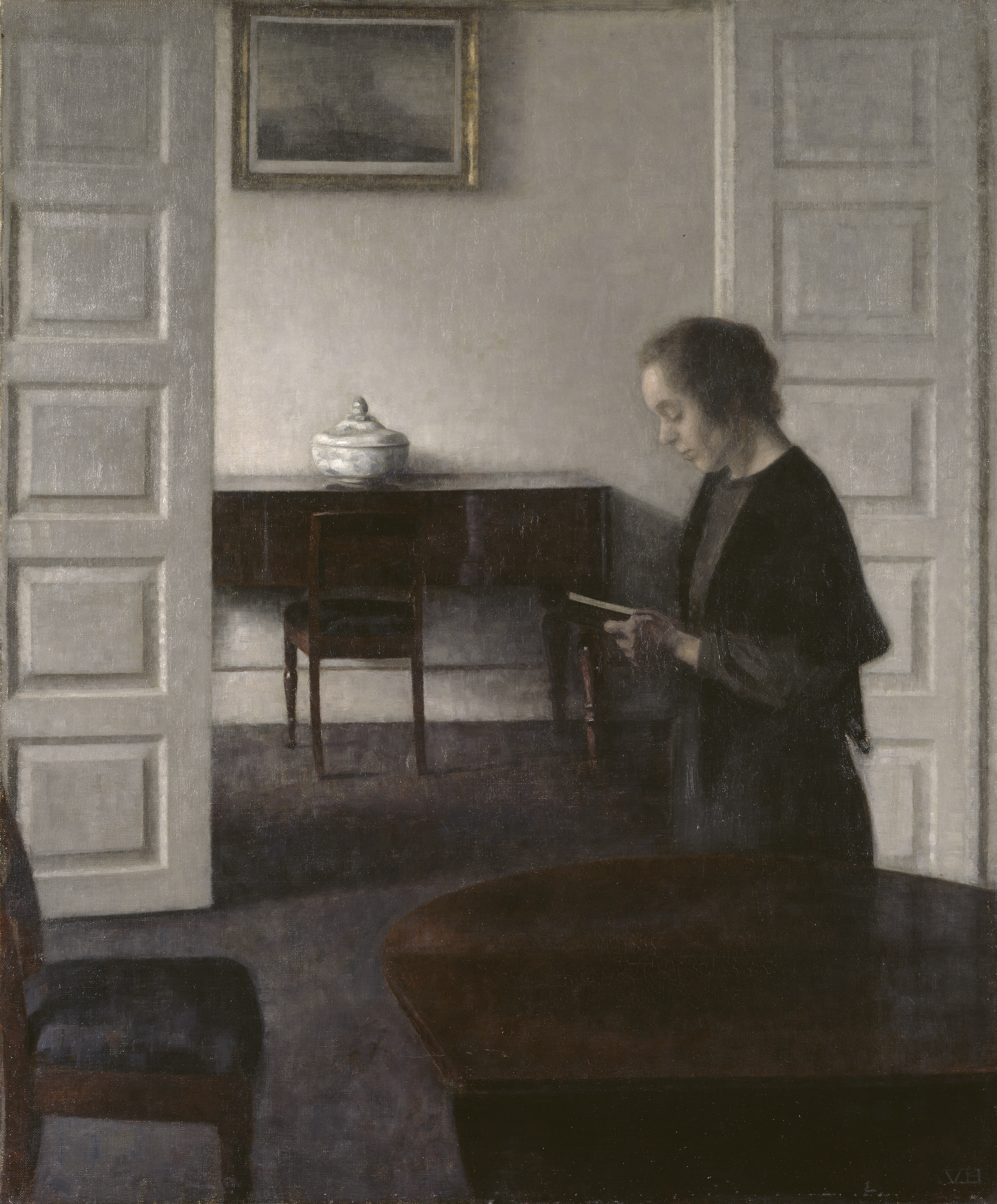
Interior with a Reading Lady, 1900

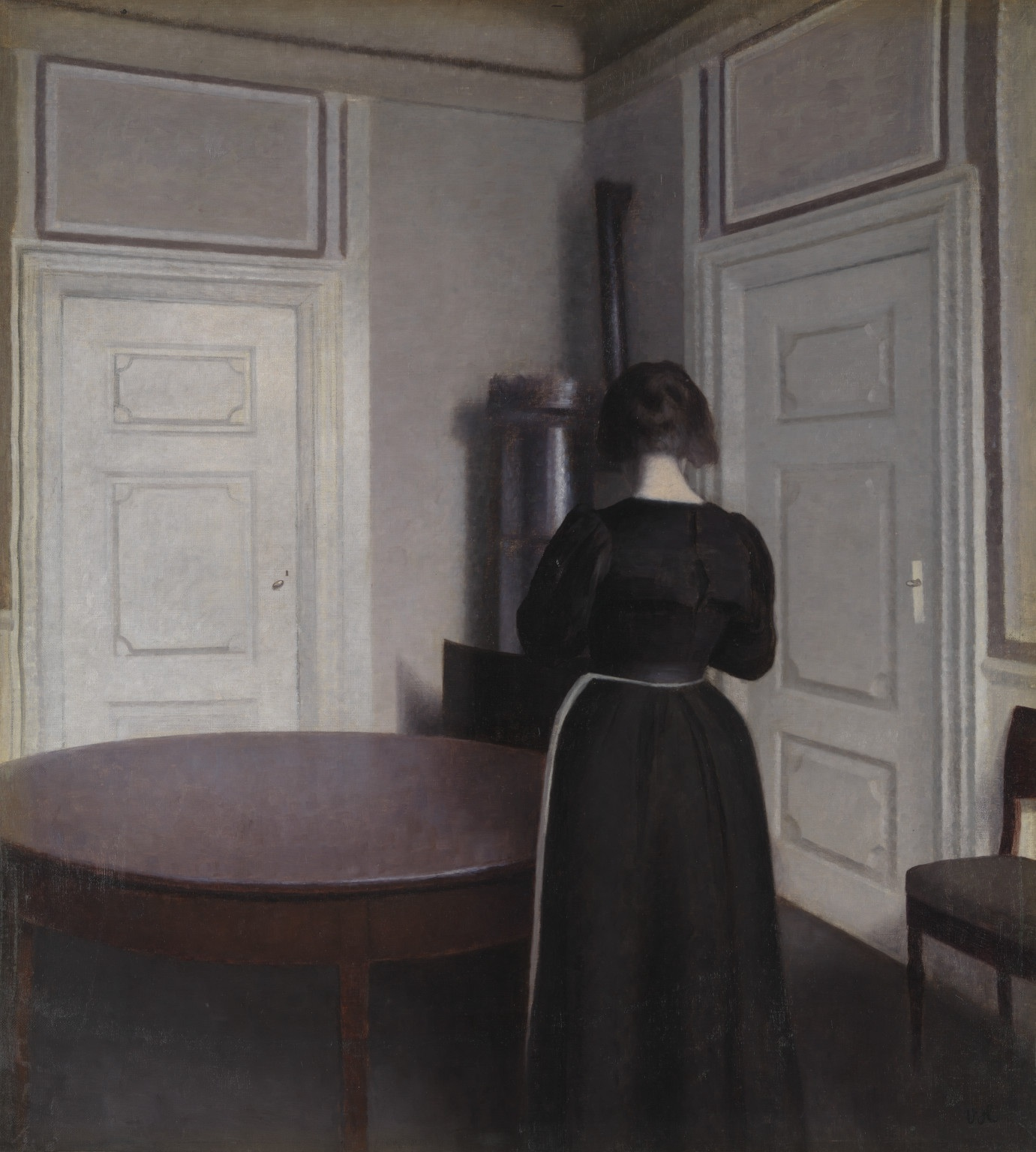
Interior, 1899

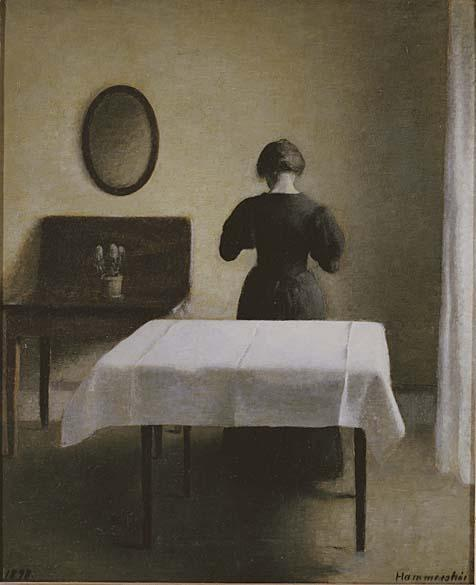
Interior, 1898

== Later history and influence ==
Hammershoi's work was well received at an exhibition in London in 2008, which revived international interest in his work. This painting had been purchased from the artist himself by Edmund Henriques and remained in the hands of his descendants until appearing on the art market in 1984. It was sold 11 June 2012 at Sotheby's London for the record-breaking price of £1.7 million.
