= Vilhelm Hammershøi =

Danish painter (1864–1916)

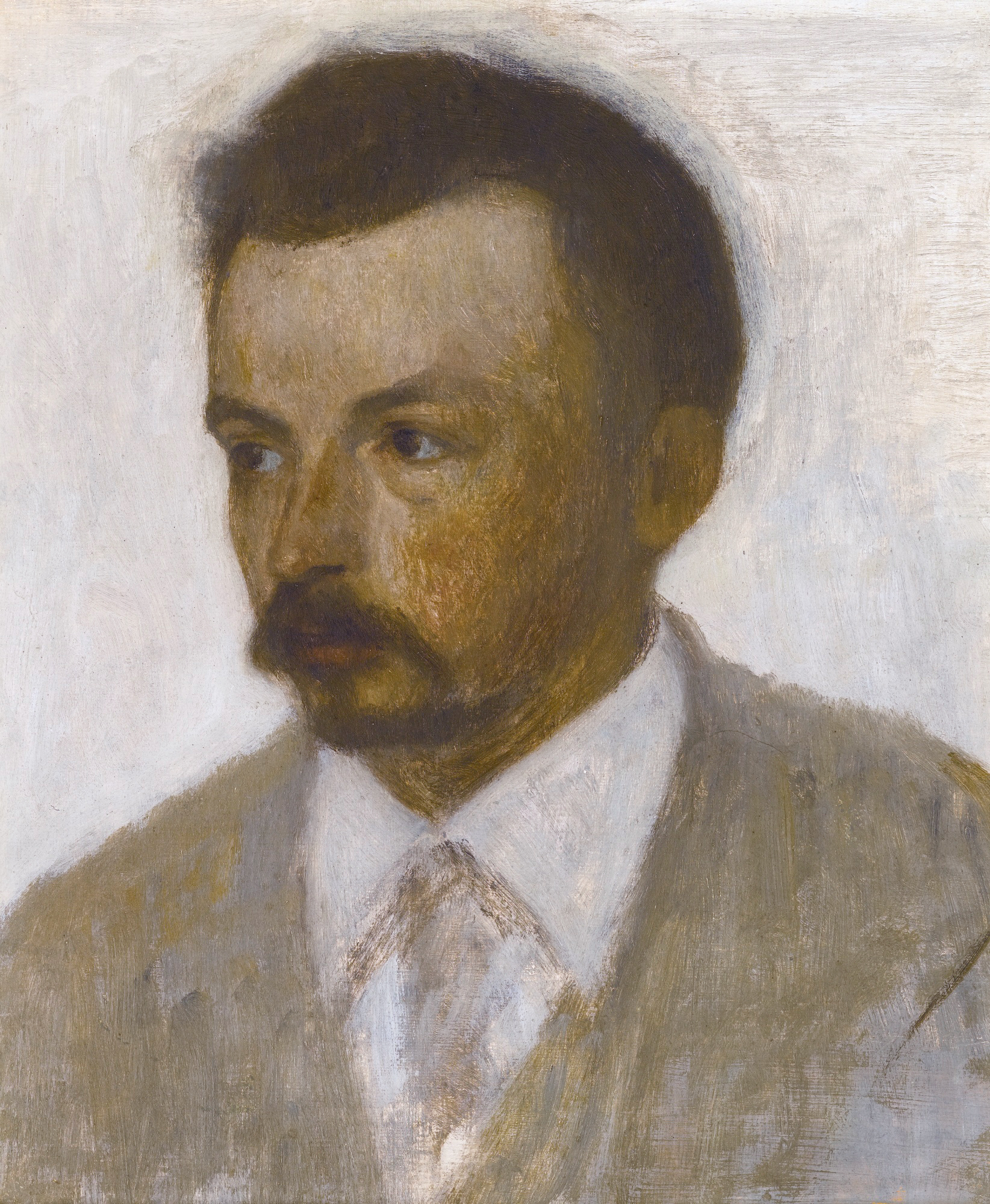
Self-portrait (1895)

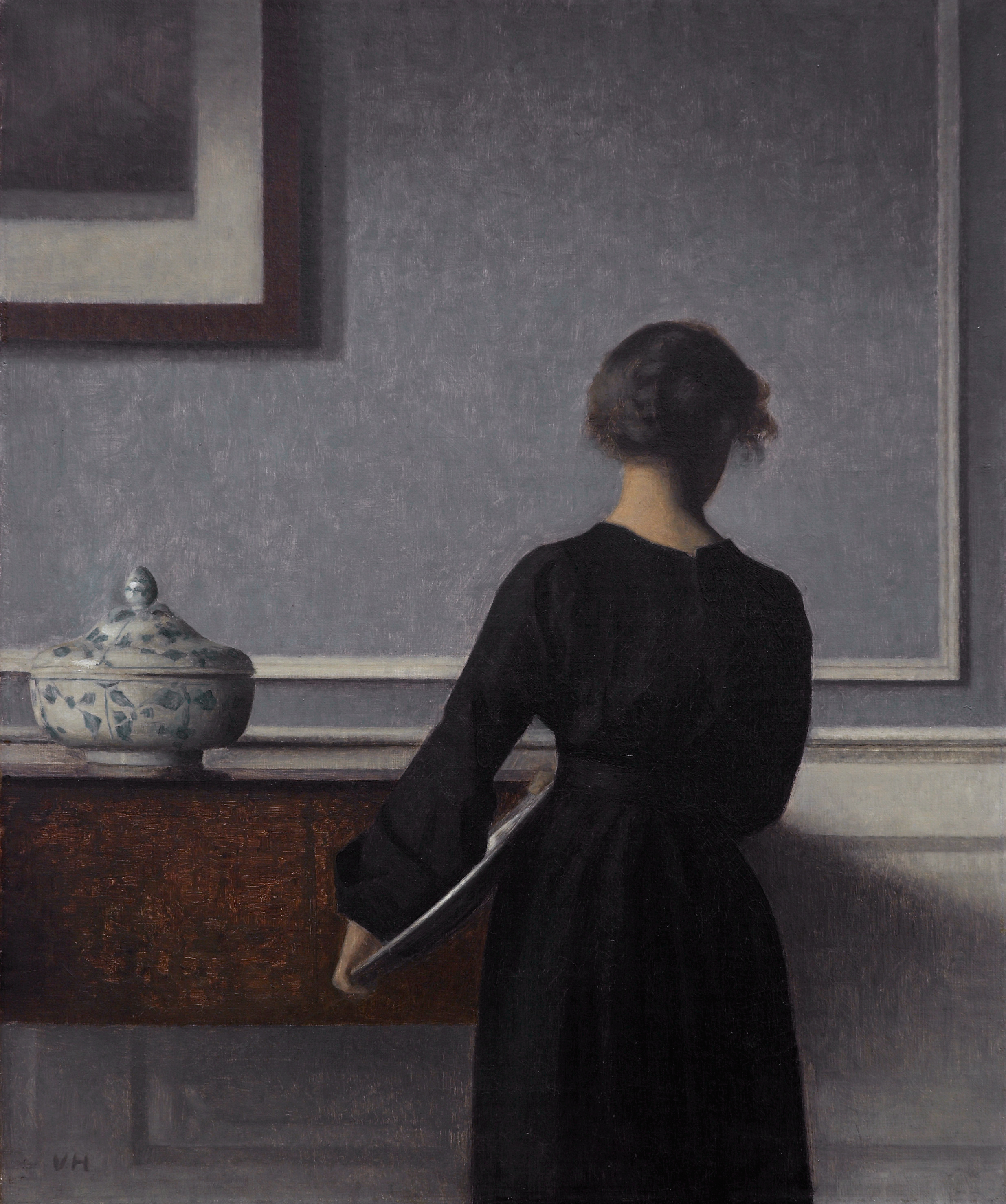
Interior with Young Woman Seen from the Back (1904)

Vilhelm Hammershøi, often anglicised as Vilhelm Hammershoi (15 May 1864 – 13 February 1916), was a Danish painter. He is known for his poetic, subdued portraits and interiors. In 1905, Rainer Maria Rilke wrote of the artist, "Hammershøi is not one of those about whom one can speak quickly. His work is wide-ranging and slow, and at whatever moment one comprehends it, it will always provide an opportunity to talk about what is important and essential in art".

== Life ==
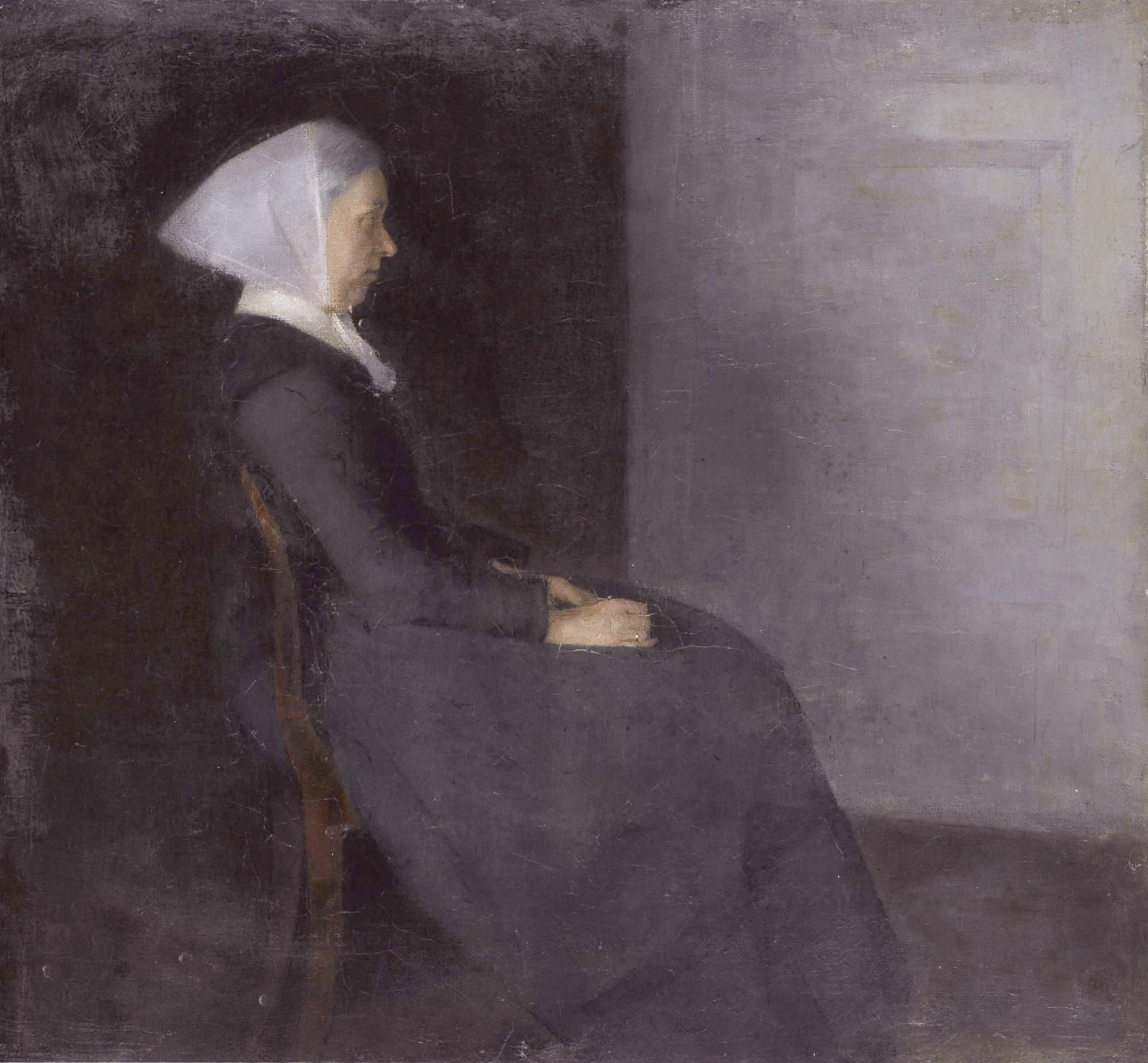
Frederikke Hammershøi, the artist's mother (1886)

Vilhelm Hammershøi was born in 1864 in Copenhagen, Denmark. He was the son of a merchant, Christian Hammershøi, and his wealthy wife, Frederikke (née Rentzmann), and had a younger brother, Svend Hammershøi, who was a ceramist and painter. Hammershøi studied drawing from the age of eight with Niels Christian Kierkegaard and Holger Grønvold, as well as painting with Vilhelm Kyhn, before embarking on studies with Frederik Vermehren and others at the Royal Danish Academy of Fine Arts. From 1883 to 1885, he studied with Peder Severin Krøyer at the Independent Study Schools (Kunstnernes Frie Studieskoler), then debuted in the Charlottenborg Spring Exhibition in 1885 with Portrait of a Young Girl (showing his sister, Anna). Pierre-Auguste Renoir is reported to have admired this painting. Hammershøi married Ida Ilsted in 1891.

== Artistic career ==
Amalienborg Square, Copenhagen (1896)

Hammershøi worked mainly in his native city, painting portraits, architecture, and interiors. He also journeyed to the surrounding countryside and locations beyond, where he painted rolling hills, stands of trees, farm houses, and other landscapes. He is most celebrated for his interiors, many of which he painted in Copenhagen at Strandgade 30 (where he lived with his wife from 1898 to 1909, and Strandgade 25 (where they lived from 1913 to 1916). He travelled widely in Europe, finding London especially atmospheric in providing locations for his highly understated work, suffused as it was at the time with a foggy, coal-smoke-polluted atmosphere. His work has been described as "Monet meets the Camden School".

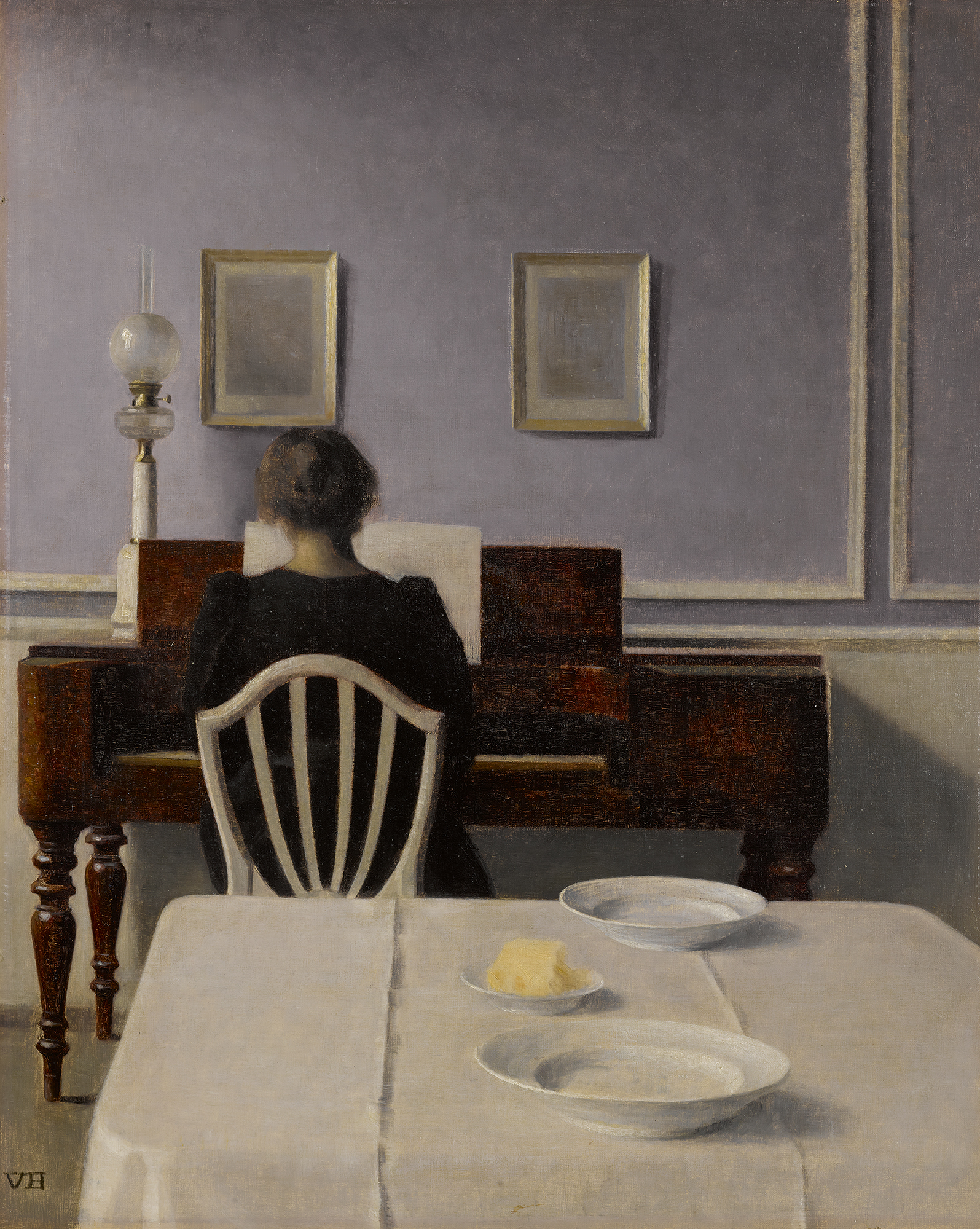
Interior with Woman at Piano, Strandgade 30 (1901)

Hammershøi's wife often appears in his interiors, and like many of his figures, is usually depicted from behind "as if absorbed in something that the viewer cannot share". Ida is also the model in many similar works by her brother, Peter Ilsted. Hammershøi and Peter were lifelong friends, business partners, and colleagues. The Metropolitan Museum of Art held an exhibition of their collective works in 2001.

== Technique ==
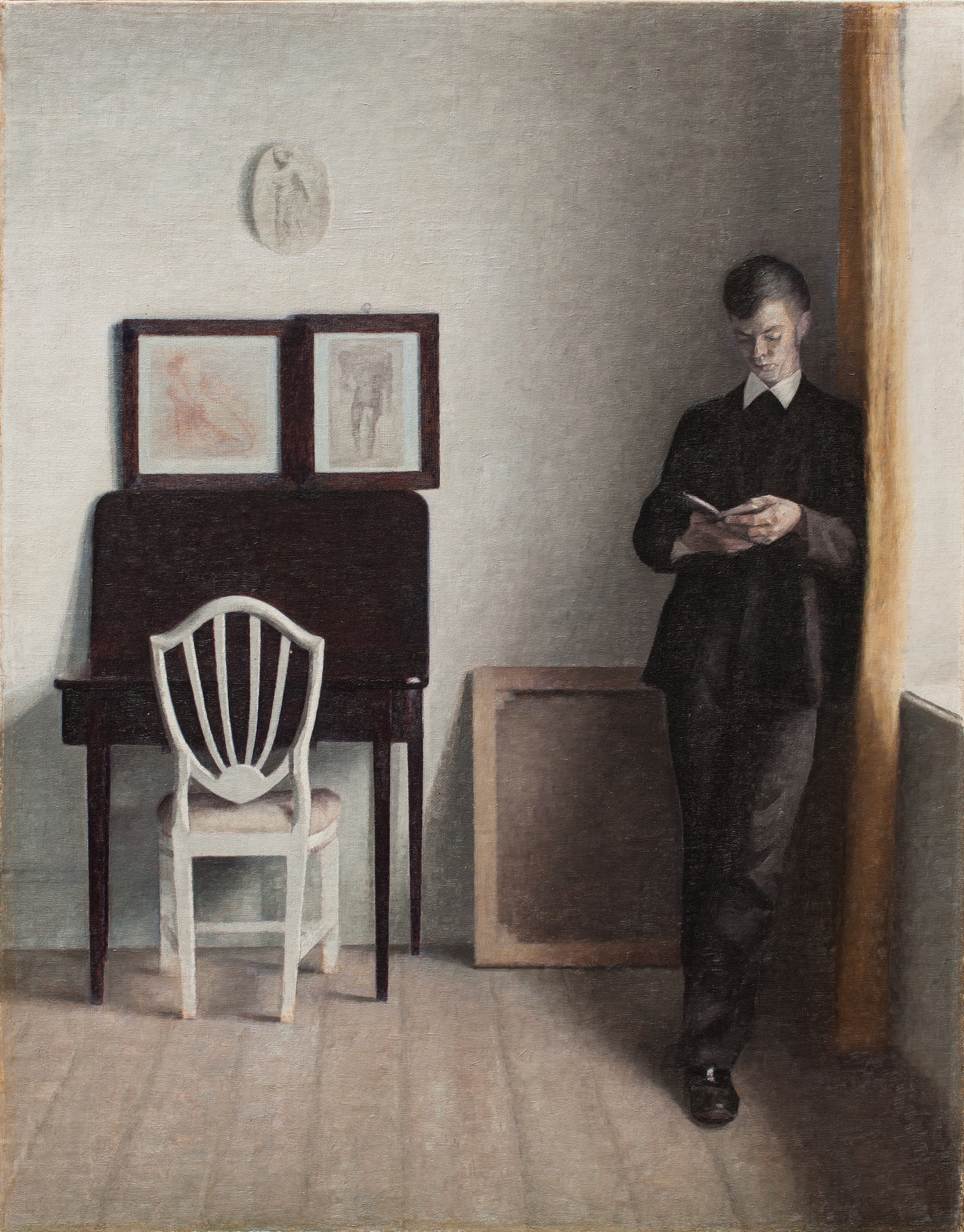
Interior with Young Man Reading (1898)

Hammershøi's paintings are best described as muted in tone. He refrained from employing bright colours (except in his very early academic works), opting always for a limited palette consisting of greys, as well as desaturated yellows, greens, and other dark hues. His tableaux of figures turned away from the viewer project an air of slight tension and mystery, while his exteriors of grand buildings in Copenhagen and in London (he painted two exteriors of the British Museum between 1905 and 1906) are devoid of people, a quality they share with his landscapes.

Interpreters of the Hammershøi's interior paintings have often noted that their power to affect viewers lies in the unique atmospheres which the artist created.

== Critical acclaim ==
Hammershøi's early works, with their simplicity and recording of the "banality of everyday life", enjoyed critical acclaim. He was sought out by artists and literary figures of the time, among them Emil Nolde and Rainer Maria Rilke, who both remarked on his retiring manner and reluctance to talk. After a trip to Paris, his work became overly detailed. According to art critic Souren Melikian, his "painterly skill remained but the magic was lost."

Hammershøi's melancholic vision has now regained its place in the public consciousness. He is now one of the best-known artists in Scandinavia, and comprehensive retrospectives of his work have been organized by the Musée d'Orsay in Paris and the Solomon R. Guggenheim Museum in New York. In 2008, the Royal Academy of Arts in London hosted the first major exhibition in Britain of Hammershøi's work, Vilhelm Hammershøi: The Poetry of Silence. Hammershøi's only painting on constant display in Britain is Interior in the National Gallery.

In 1997, Denmark issued a postage stamp in his honour.

== BBC documentary ==
In 2005, Hammershøi's life and oeuvre was featured in a BBC television documentary, Michael Palin and the Mystery of Hammershoi, with the British comedian and writer Michael Palin. In the programme, Palin, fascinated by Hammershøi, whose pictures he conceived as having a distinct enigmatic coolness and distance about them, sets out to unlock the mysteries and find out about the background of Hammershøi. Palin, wanting to know of his inspirations and the reason for these mystical pictures, started his search in Hayward Gallery in London, goes to Amsterdam and finally to Copenhagen. At the end of his journey, Palin commented: "There's a tendency now to want to know our artists, to expect them to reveal everything before we can properly judge their work. I think the key to understanding Hammersøi is that he deliberately didn't want us to know him. He was an artist. He made paintings. The rest is silence".

== Highest auction price for Danish work ==
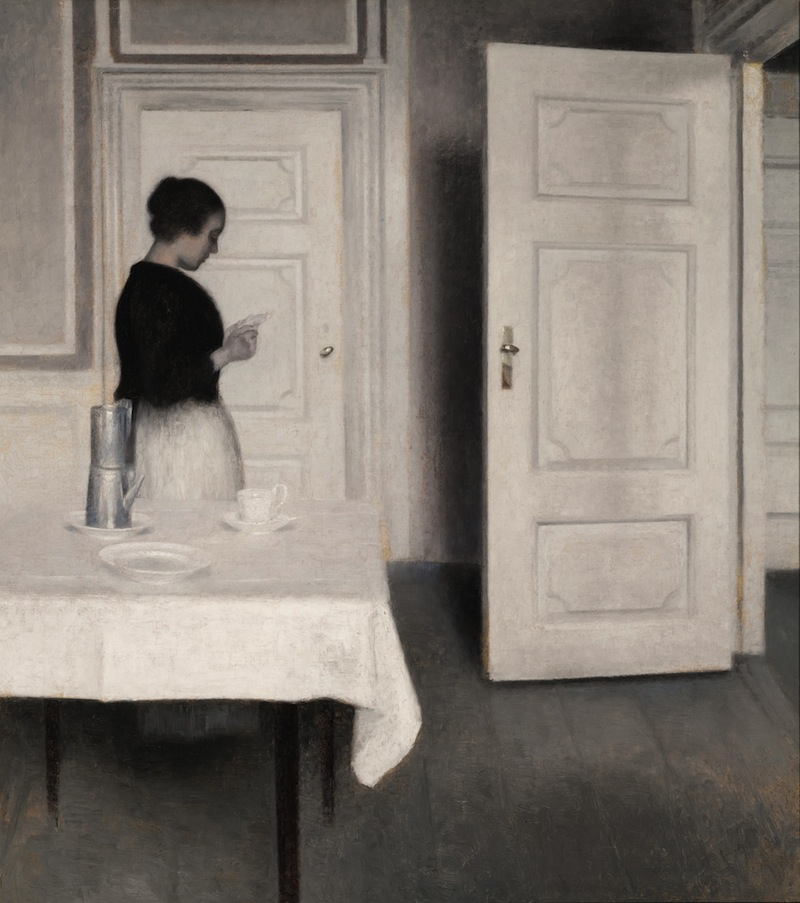
Ida Reading a Letter (1899)

In June 2012, Hammershøi's Ida Reading a Letter was auctioned by Sotheby's in London for £1,721,250 or DKK 15,747,499, a record for any Danish work of art. Two other paintings by Hammershøi were also sold the same day at Sotheby's for unusually high prices: Interior with Two Candles was auctioned for DKK 10,110,000 and Ida in Interior for DKK 6,120,000.

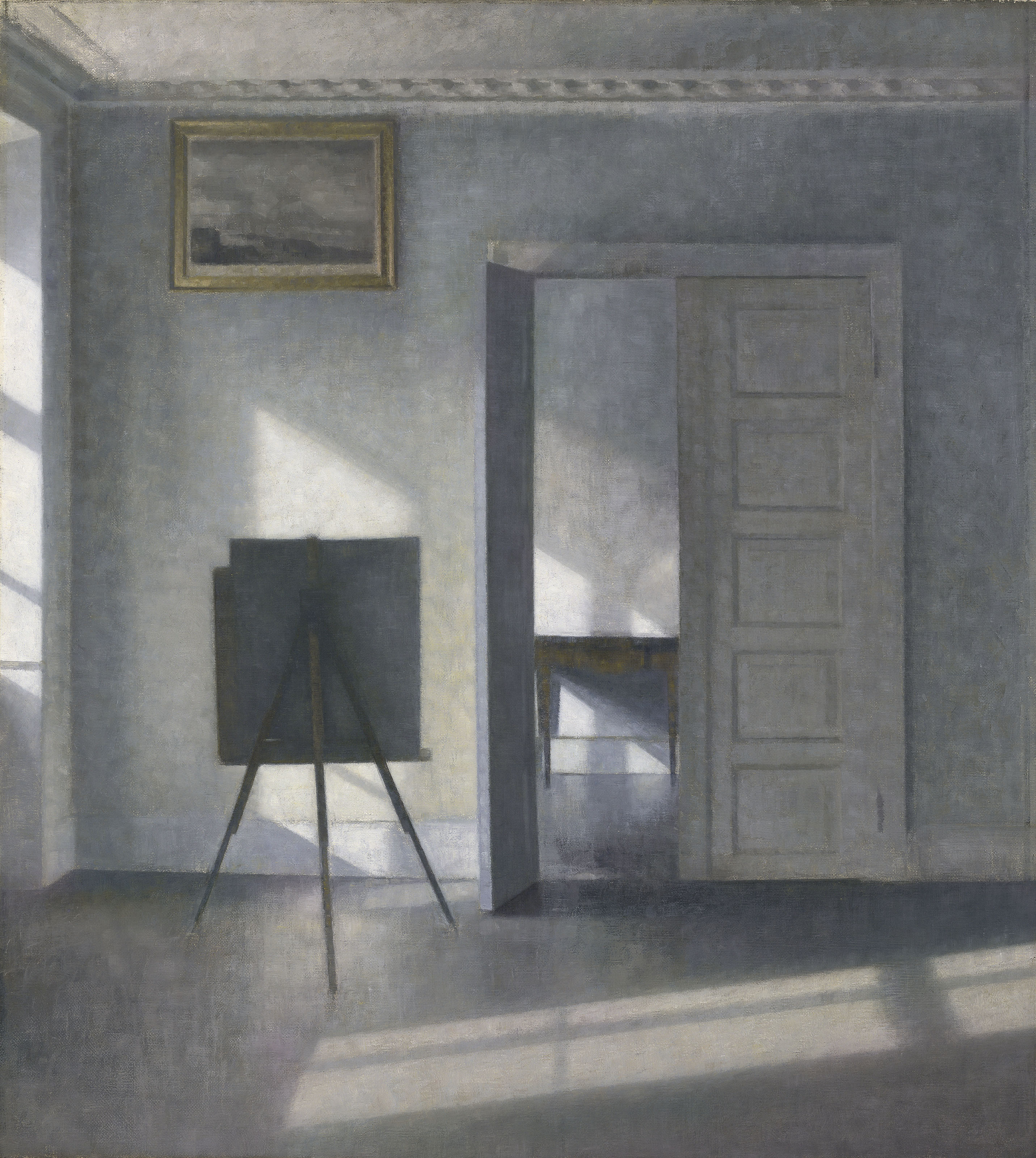
Interior with an Easel, Bredgade 25 (1912)

In December 2018, following Christie's New York European Art auction, The Getty Museum acquired the painting Interior with an Easel, Bredgade 25 (1912) for $5,037,500.

== Exhibitions ==
- Vilhelm Hammershøi: The Poetry of Silence, Royal Academy, Sackler Wing of Galleries, London, 28 June–7 September 2008
- Vilhelm Hammershøi: The Poetry of Silence, The National Museum of Western Art, Tokyo, Japan ( – 7 November 2008)
- Vilhelm Hammershoi's Paintings at Scandinavia House, Scandinavia House, New York
- Painting Tranquility: Masterworks by Vilhelm Hammershøi, Art Gallery of Ontario, Toronto, Canada, 16 April–3 July 2016
- Vilhelm Hammershøi: Light and Silence, National Museum in Kraków, Kraków, Poland, 4 March–8 May 2022

== See also ==
- Art of Denmark
- Dust Motes Dancing in Sunbeams
