= Johan David Vogel =

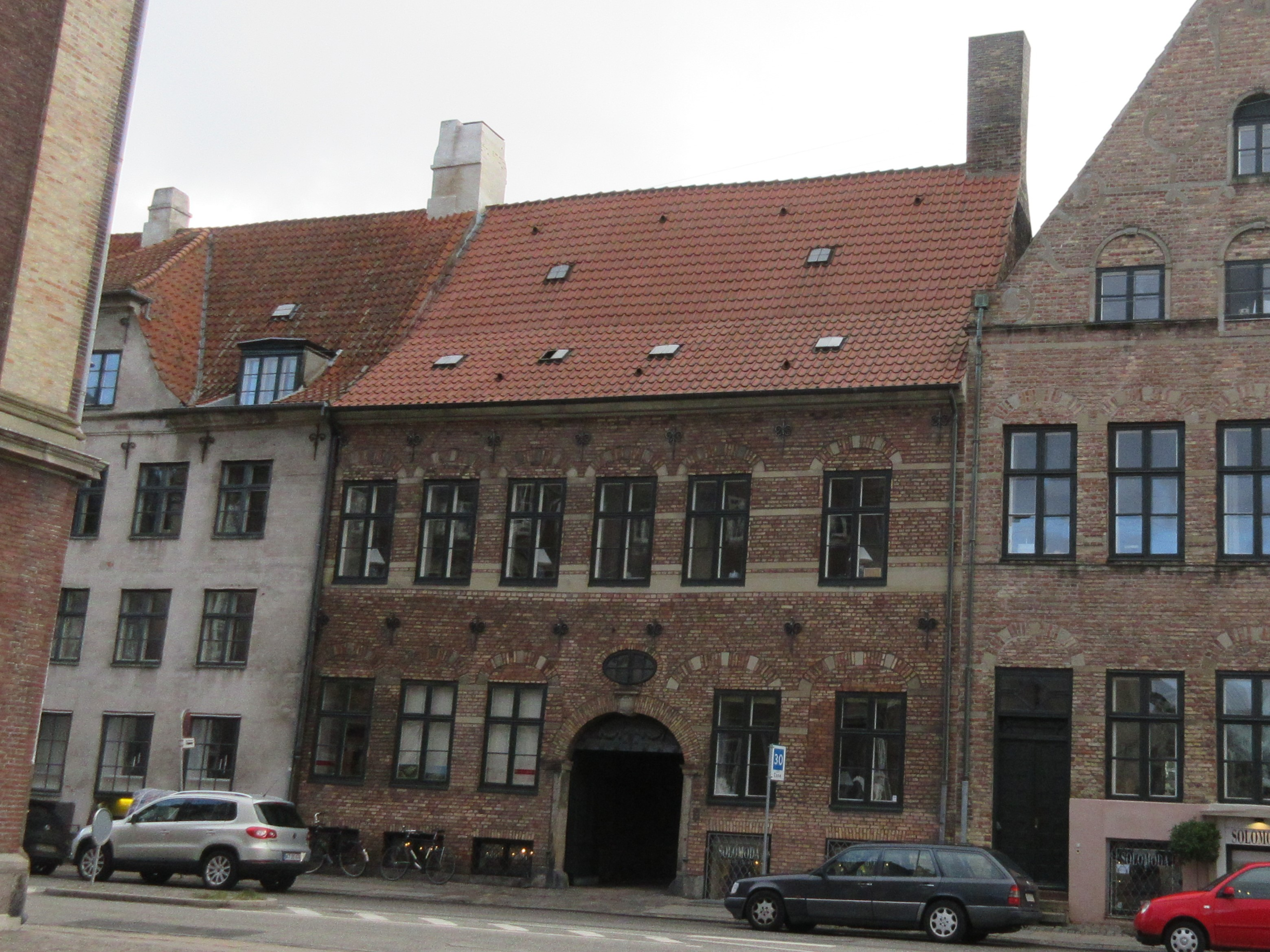
Vogel's property at Strandgade 30 in Christianshavn, Copenhagen.

Johan David Vogel (11 December 1759 – 6 February 1829) was a Danish businessman and brewer.

== Early life ==
Vogel was born on 11 December 1759 in Åbenrå. His parents were Jochim Christian Vogels and Gundel Heinsen.

== Career ==
On 13 August 1787, Vogel was granted citizenship as a brewer in Copenhagen. In 1788, he bought the property at Strandgade 30. On 19 June 1795, shortly after the Copenhagen Fire of 1795, he was appointed as one of the extra directors of Kjøbenhavns Brandforsikring.

In 1797, Vogel was also granted citizenship as a wholesaler (grosserer). In the same year, he became a member of Grosserer-Societetet. He completed at least 20 expeditions to the Danish West Indies with his own merchant ships. His ships included the frigates Geheimeraad Numsen (1796–1803), Albertine Wilhelmine (1798-) and Grev Bernstorff (1806-) and the brig Ida (1815–1819). In 1708. Albertine Wilhelminepicked up 158 enslaved Africans at the Danish Gold Coast en route to the Danisg West Indies.

During the Gunboat War, Vogel equipped a number of privateering vessels. He obtained letters of mark for the brigs Christiansborg and Pauline as well as for the shallops Patrioten and Baadene, Dannebrog, De 8 Venner and "Kongen af Rom.

In 1801, Vogel bought the warehouse at Overgaden Neden Vamdet No. 15A. The property Strandgade 4 was later (after 1806) also acquired by Vogel. Strandgade 30 and Strandgade 4 were both sold by Vogel in 1819. Strandgade 4 was sold at auction to Jacob Holm.

== Personal life ==
Vogel's first wife was Barbara Cathrine Enghaven- They had no children. She died in 1790. On 9 December 1790, he was married to Eggardine Lovisa Beyer (1773–1816). She was a daughter of vicar Seyer Mahling Beyer and Wilhelmine Augusta Hopmann. Most of their 12 children did not survive childhood.. Vogel died on 6 February 1829.
