= Kronprinsensgade 7 =

Historic building in Copenhagen, Denmark

Coordinates: 55°40′51″N 12°34′45″E

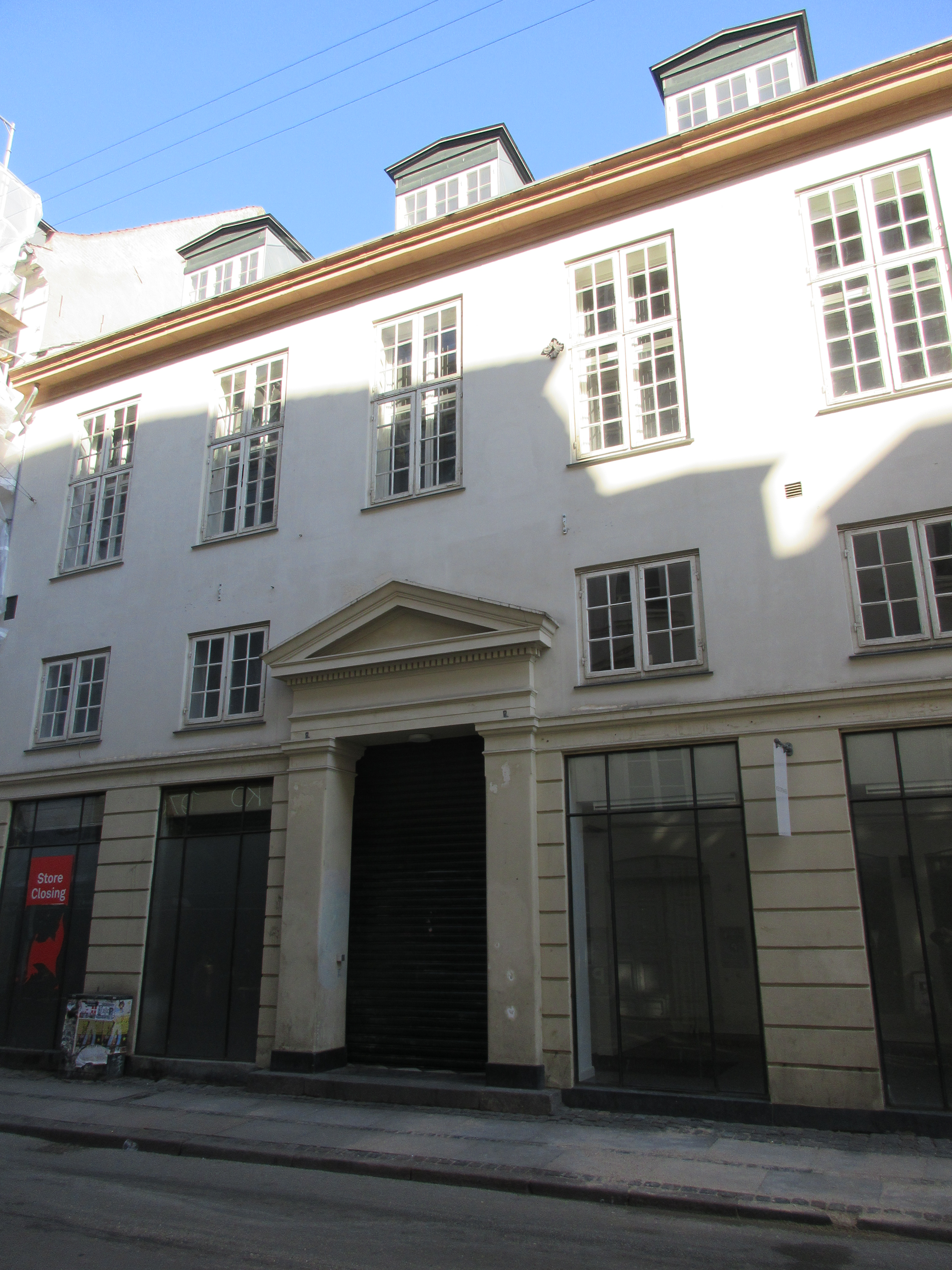
The building in 2017

Kronprinsensgade 7 is a former Freemasons' hall located in Kronprinsensgade 7 in central Copenhagen, Denmark. The three-storey, Neoclassical building is from 1807. It was listed on the Danish registry of protected buildings and places in 1816.

== History ==
=== Site history, 1689–1795 ===
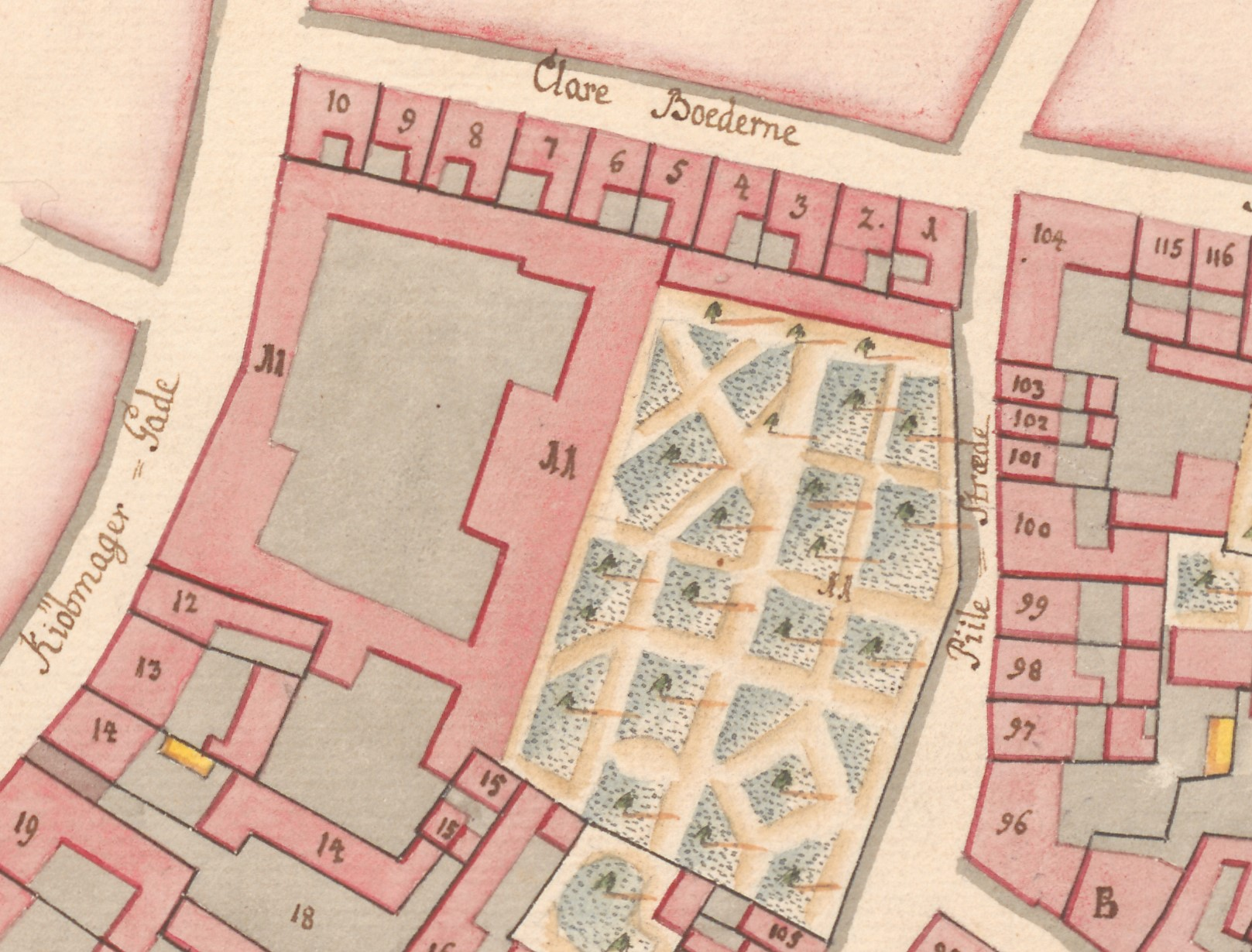
No. 11 seen on a detail from Christian Gedde's map of Købmager Quarter, 1757.

The site was formerly part of a much larger property which reached all the way from Købmagergade to Pilestræde. This property was listed in Copenhagen's first cadastre of 1689 as No. 11 in Købmager Quarter and belonged to count Reventlow at that time.

The property was acquired by the master carpenter Johan Peter Boye Junge (1735–1807) in 1793 and he was subsequently granted royal permission to create the new street Kronprinsensgade on the site.

=== The Freemasons1795–1868 ===
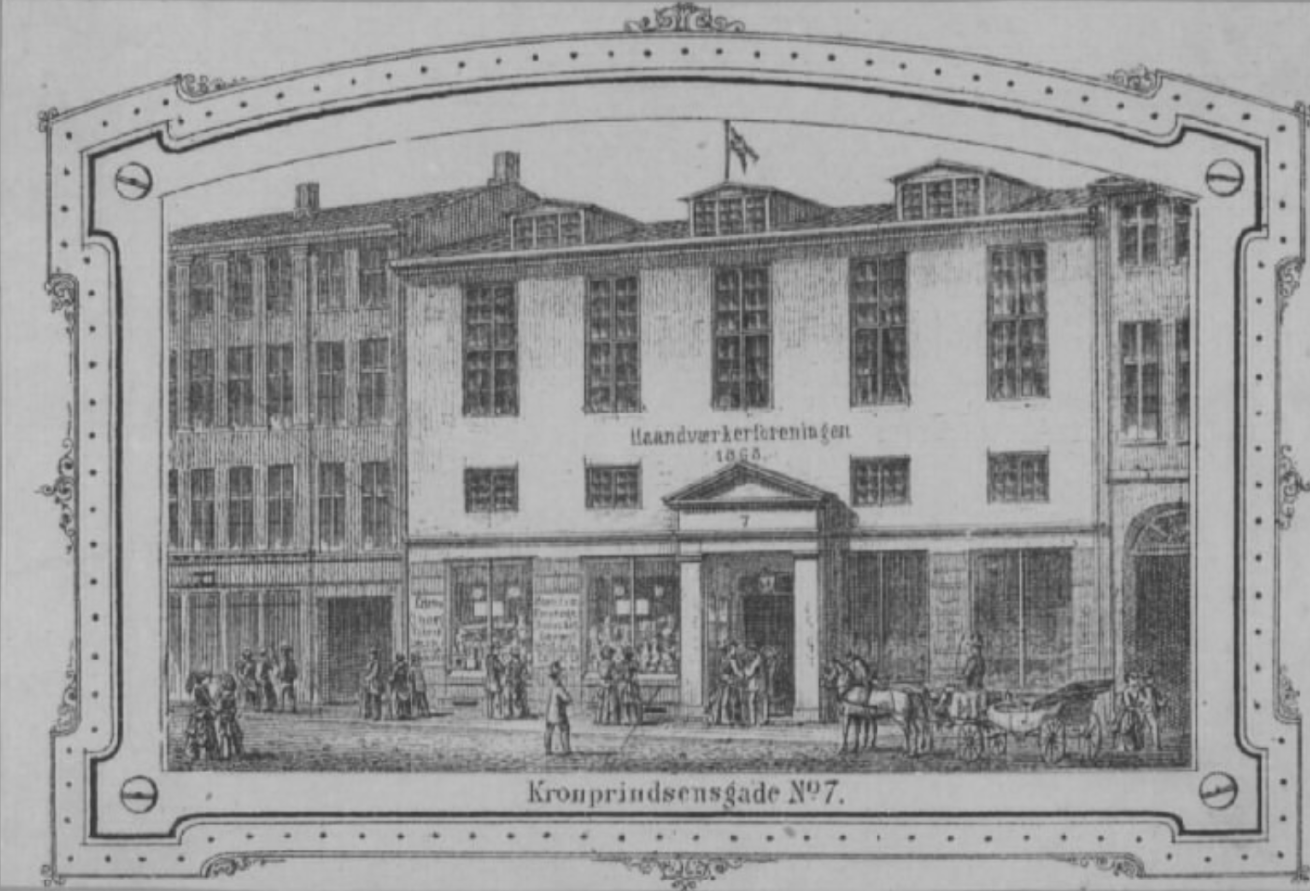
The old freemasons' hall in Kronprinsensgade

The building was constructed for De Forenede Frimurerloger by Peder Friis (1763–1831) in 1805–1807. It was inaugurated on 7 January 1807. The Freemasons left the building when they inaugurated their new headquarters at Klerkgade 2 on 6 October 1868.

A.C. Perch's Tea Shop was founded in the building in 1835 but later moved to No. 5 where it is still located. The shop premises at No. 7 was later taken over by Jacob Lund's Bookshop. It had previously been based at Købmagergade 31 and specialized in scientific literature about medicine. It later moved to Pilestræde.

=== Later history ===
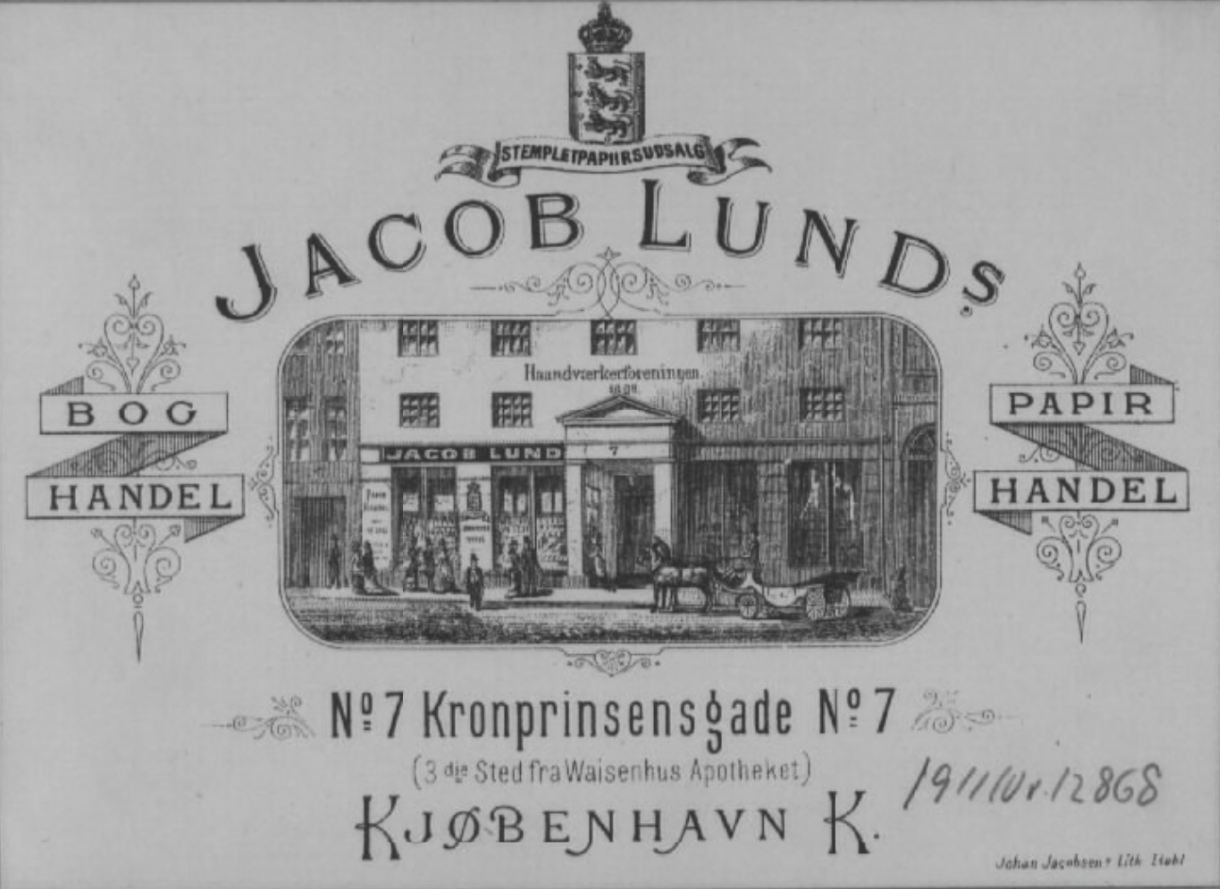
Jacob Lund's Bookshop

The building in Kronprinsensgade was taken over by the Association of Craftsmen in Copenhagen in 1869. Their facilities included a reading room, a billiard room and a library with circa 2,000 volumes. The Association of Craftsmen relocated to the Moltke Mansion at the corner of Bredgade and Dronningens Rværgade in 1932.

The building has more recently hosted Københavns Musikteater (Copenhagen Music Theatre) but it moved out in Spring 2016.

== Architecture ==
The building consists of three storeys and a cellar and is five bays wide. Over the main entrance is a triangular pediment.

== Today ==
A Cheap Monday store is today located in the ground floor.
