= Carletti =

Carletti is an Italian surname. Notable people with the surname include:

- Angelo Carletti di Chivasso (1411–1495), Italian theologian
- Beppe Carletti (born 1946), Italian musician
- Cristian Carletti (born 1996), Italian footballer
- Cristóforo Chrisostome Carletti (1564–1634), Italian Roman Catholic bishop
- Francesco Carletti (1573–1636), Florentine merchant, explorer and writer
- Giuseppe Carletti (born 1959), former Italian World Cup alpine ski racer
- Joseph Carletti (born 1946), former French racing cyclist
- Louise Carletti (1922–2002), French film actress
- Massimiliano Carletti (born 1973), Italian footballer
- Shola Carletti (fl. 21st century), Italian painter, sculptor and former graphic designer
- Tommaso Carletti (1860–1919), Governor of Italian Somalia
