= Galle & Jessen =

Danish chocolate and confectionery brand

Galle & Jessen is a Danish chocolate and confectionery brand founded in 1872 and now owned by Toms International.

== History ==
Galle & Jessen was founded as an independent company by Edvard W. Galle (1844-1900) and Hans Jessen (1851-1907). It was initially based in a cellar at Store Kongensgade 6 but relocated to larger premises at Toldbodgade 15 in 1873.

The company was converted into a limited company (aktieselskab) in 1883 and a large new factory at Vibenhus Runddel was inaugurated in 1884. The factory was later expanded several times. The company was acquired by Toms International in 1971.

== Products ==
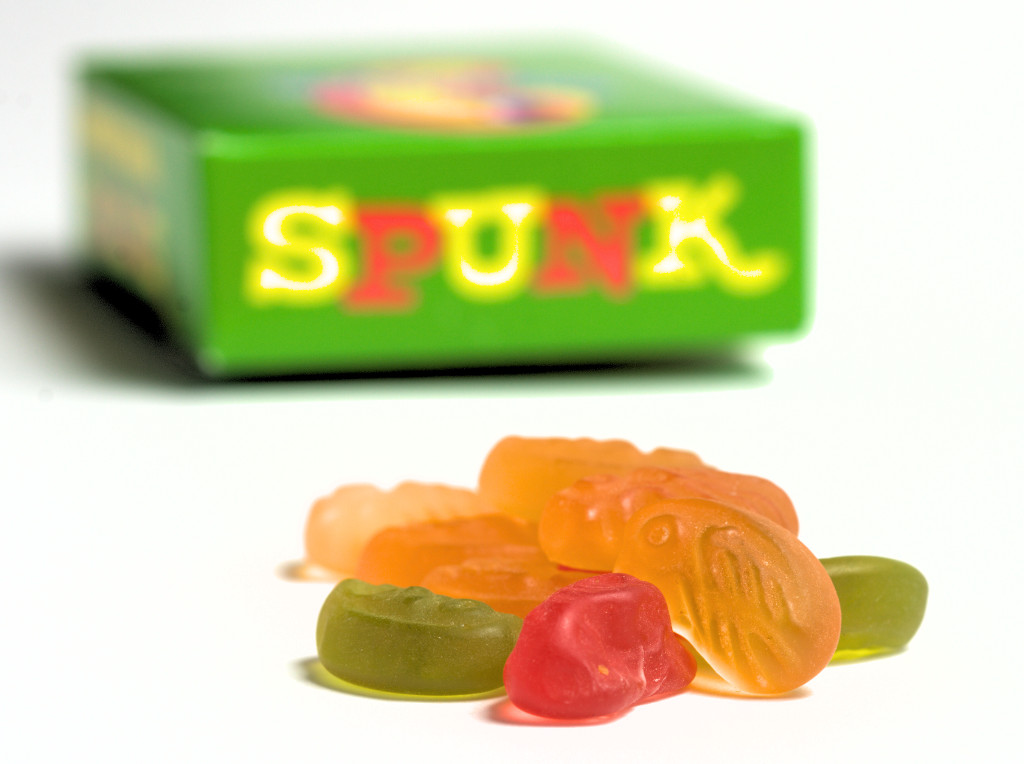
Spunk

Products marketed under the Galle & Jessen brand include:

- pålægschokolade
- Spunk
- Ga-Jol pastilles were introduced in 1933.

== See also ==
- C. R. Evers & Co.
