= List of purveyors to the Court of Denmark =

Royal warrants of appointment in Denmark are historically differentiated between purveyors to the king or queen (Danish: Kongelig Hofleverandør) and purveyors to the royal Danish court (Leverandør til Det Kongelige Danske Hof). In November 2024, King Frederik X announced that the royal warrants would be phased out by 2029 with none of the existing ones being renewed. This was done as a way to modernise the monarchy.

== Purveyors ==
There are approximately 100 purveyors to the Danish Court, including:

- A. Dragsted
- A. Michelsen
- Anthon Berg
- A.C. Perch's Thehandel
- Albani Brewery
- Anker Kysters Eftf.
- ASP-Holmblad
- Bang & Olufsen
- Beauvais
- Bering House of Flowers
- Bing & Grøndahl
- Birger Christensen A/S
- Bisca A/S
- Bon Gout
- Bornholms Konservesfabrik
- C.E. Fritzsche
- C.L. Seifert
- Carl Petersens Blomsterhandel
- Carlsberg Group
- Castrol
- Celli Freifeldt
- Ceres Brewery
- Co'libri
- Danæg
- Dansukker
- De Danske Spritfabrikker
- Deerhunter
- Royal Copenhagen
- egetæpper a/s
- Egmont Group
- F. Bülow & Co.
- Ford Motor Company
- Georg Bestle
- Georg Jensen Damask
- Georg Jensen A/S
- Glyngøre Limfjord
- Grundfos
- H. Carstensen Malerforretning
- Hannibal Sander
- Harboe's Brewery
- Holger Clausens Bolighus
- Holmegaards Glasværker
- Høng Skimmeloste
- IBM
- ILLUM A/S
- Illums Bolighus
- J.C. Hempel's Skibsfarve-Fabrik A/S
- Jacob Kongsbak Lassen
- Jean-Leonard
- Jysk
- Kay Bojesen A/S
- Kelsen Group A/S
- Kjær & Sommerfeldt A/S
- Kongens Bryghus
- Kristian F. Møller
- L & S Signal Textiles
- Lauritz Knudsen A/S
- Le Klint A/S
- Lego Group
- Limfjords Østers Kompagniet A/S
- LINDBERG A/S
- M.W. Mørch & Søns Eftf.
- Magasin du Nord
- Morsø Jernstøberi A/S
- Munke Mølle A/S
- Nybo Jensen Konfektion A/S
- Odense Marcipan A/S
- Ole Lynggaard Copenhagen
- Ole Mathiesen A/S
- Oluf Brønnum & Co. A/S
- Cherry Heering
- P. Hertz
- Peter Justesen Company A/S
- Poulsen Roser A/S
- Raadvad A/S
- Randers Handskefabrik
- Royal Copenhagen
- Royal Greenland
- S. Dyrup & Co
- Schous Beslagsmedie
- Skælskør Frugtplantage A/S
- Skandinavisk Motor Co. A/S
- Sømods Bolcher
- Statoil A/S
- Steff-Houlberg
- Sv. Michelsen Chokolade A/S
- Tapet-Café
- TDC Tele Danmark
- Thiele
- Royal Unibrew
- Toms International
- Tørsleff & Co
- Trianon
- Tuborg Brewery
- Tulip Food Company
- Volvo Cars
- Warre's Port Wine
- Xerox
- Århus Possementfabrik A/S

== Bibliography ==
- Zalewski, Barbara (2000). Under Kronen. Historien om den kongelige husholdning og hofleverandørerne gennem 800 år [Under the Crown. The story of the royal household and purveyors to the royal court through 800 years] (in Danish). Copenhagen: Forlaget Nostra. ISBN 978-87-91002-00-7.
- Jespersen, Knud J.V.; Sveistrup, Søren; Rasmussen, Mikael Bøgh (20 November 2024). "Hofleverandør" (in Danish). Den Store Danske Encyklopædi.
