= Yankie =

Yankie can refer to:

- Yankee, slang for a person of United States origin, or specifically from northern US or New England
- Yankie bar, a Danish chocolate bar confectionery

== See also ==
- Yankee (disambiguation)
