= Pålægschokolade =

Thin sheets of chocolate to put on bread

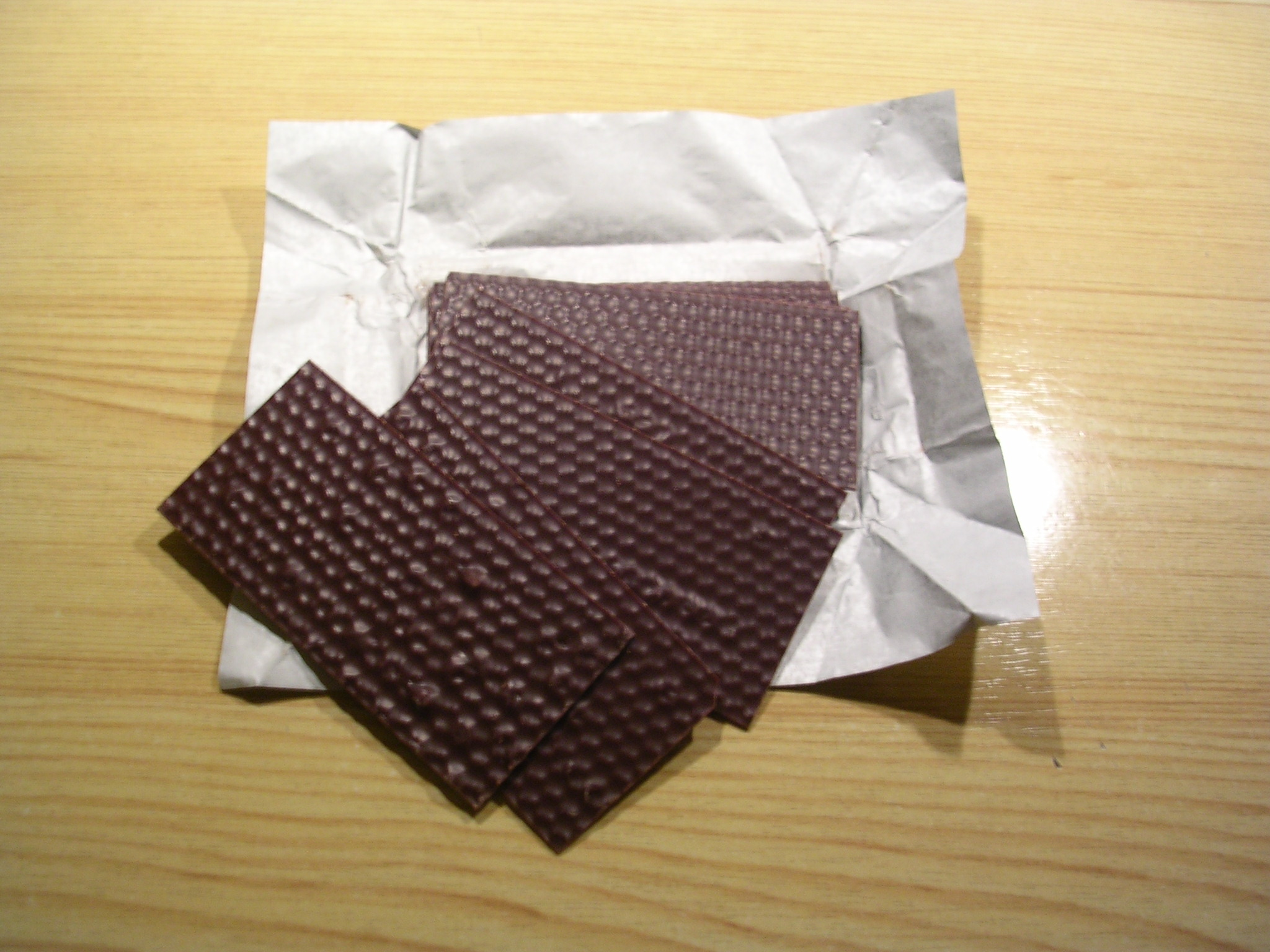
- Pålægschokolade made by Toms.
- Type: Confectionery
- Place of origin: Denmark
- Main ingredients: Chocolate or compound chocolate

Pålægschokolade (lit. 'chocolate to lay on' or 'chocolate topping') are thin slices of chocolate (or vekao) that are used as a topping (in Danish, pålæg) on bread, such as rugbrød or white bread, similar to how chocolate spread is used in many countries. It is common in Denmark.

It is available in both milk and dark chocolate, with the milk variety being more common (the Danish confectioner Toms sells 70% milk and 30% dark).

It was originally introduced to the Danish market by Galle & Jessen in 1963.

== Producers ==
- Toms
- Galle & Jessen
- Carletti

== See also ==
- Vlokken
- Sprinkles
