= P. Hertz =

Jeweller in Copenhagen (1834)

P. Hertz is a leading Danish jeweller based at Købmagergade 34 in Copenhagen, Denmark. The firm was founded by goldsmith Peter Hertz in 1834 and is still owned by the Hertz family. P. Hertz is based at the corner of Købmagergade and Kronprinsensgade in central Copenhagen. The building dates from 1785 and was designed by Johan Peter Boye Junge. It is Purveyor to the Court of Denmark.

== History ==
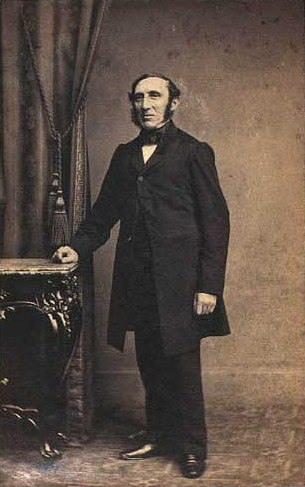
Peter Hertz

The company was founded on 29 November 1834 by goldsmith Peter Hertz (1811-1885).

Hertz' two sons, Sally Hertz (1844-1896) and Jacob Hertz (1846), took over the operations in 1875. They also established a silver factory under the name S. & J. Hertz. Jacob Hertz became the sole owner of the firm after his brother's death. Johan A. Hertz (born 1876) became a partner in the firm in 1917 and was its sole owner from 1945.

== Location ==
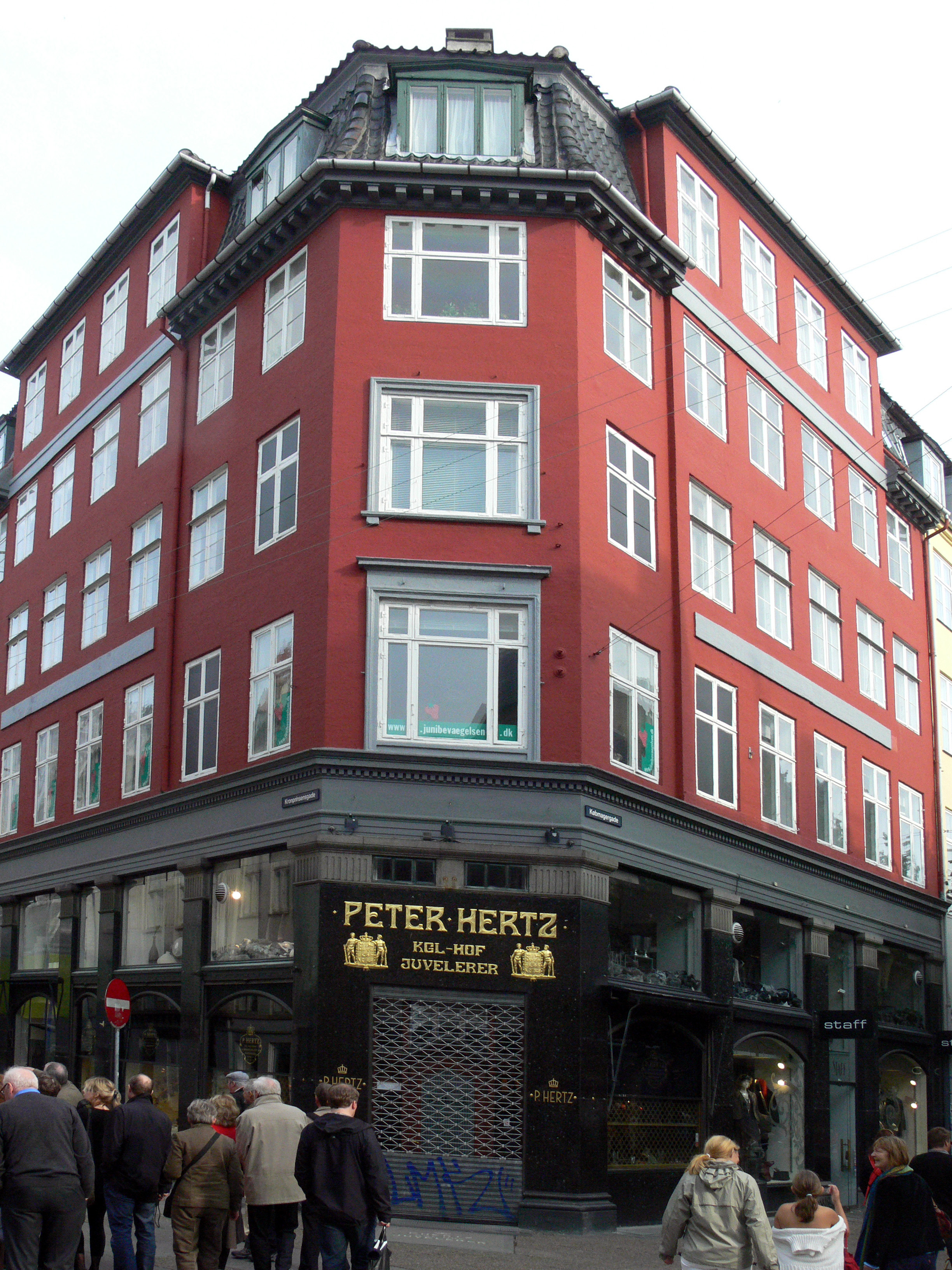
Købmagergade 34

P. Hertz is based at the corner of Købmagergade and Kronprinsensgade in central Copenhagen. The building dates from 1785 and was designed by Johan Peter Boye Junge. Peter Hertz ran his business from the premises from 1841 and purchased the building in 1856. The building is now owned by Kgl. hofjuveler Knud Hertz og hustru Lilia Hertz Fond.

== Gallery ==
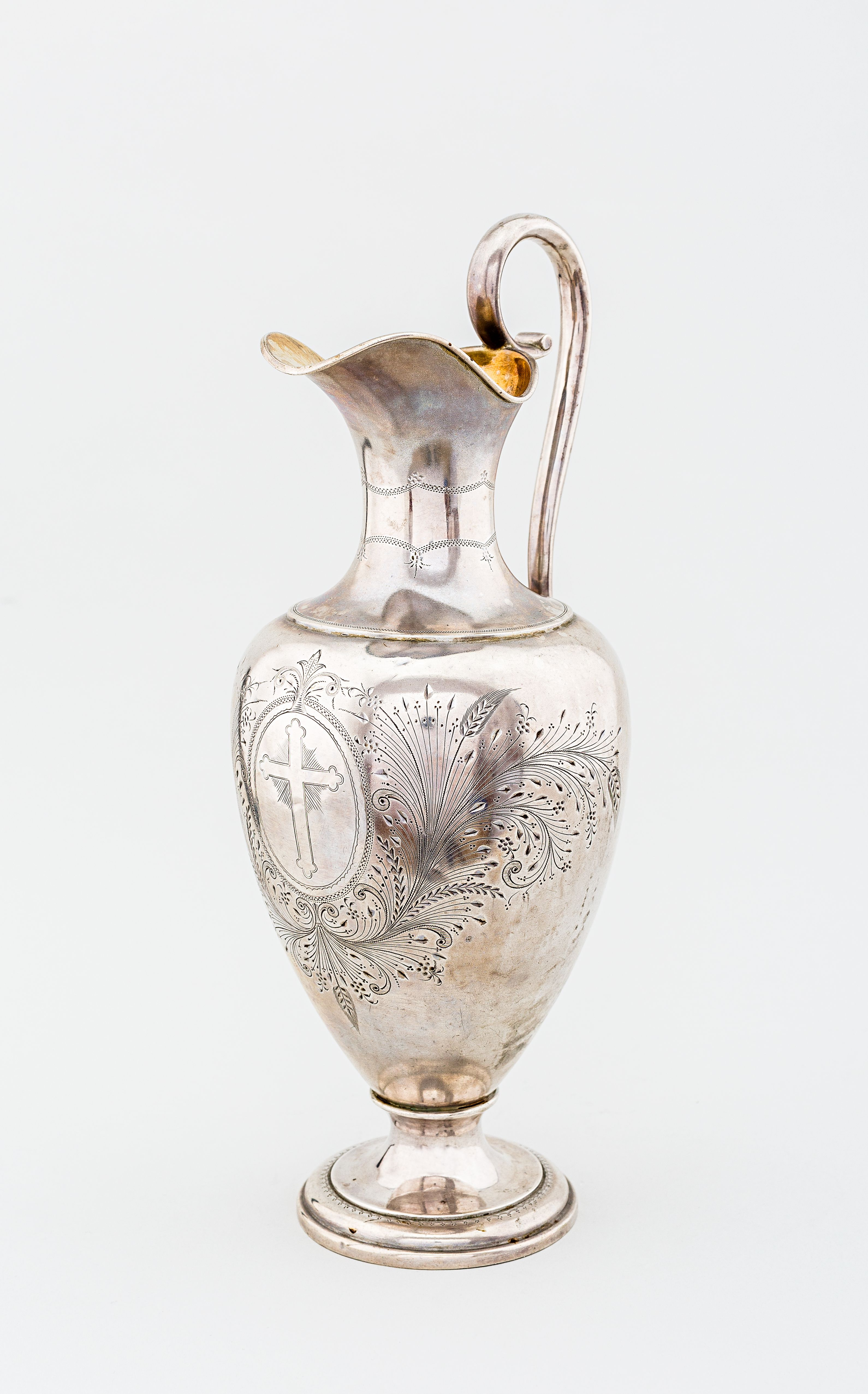
Altar jug by Peter Hertz, Stenstrup Church, 1880
