= Julius Hoffensberg =

Danish businessperson (1828–1895)

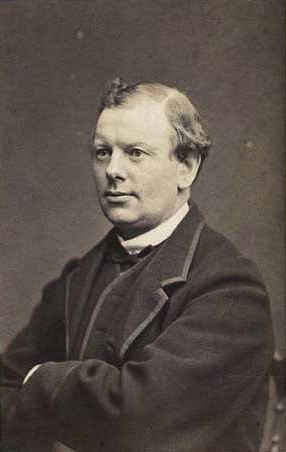
- Hoffensberg photographed by Peter Most
- Born: 20 July 1828; Copenhagen, Denmark
- Died: 28 March 1895 (aged 66); Ordrup, Denmark
- Occupation: Businessman

Julius Hoffensberg (20 July 1828 – 28 March 1895) was a Danish businessperson.

== Early life and education ==
Hoffensberg was born in Copenhagen, the son of military officer and lithographer Frantz Hoffensberg (1804–419) and Else Kirstine Møller. His father was later married second time to Caroline Sørensen.

Hoffensberg was educated as a typographer in W. Laub's book printing business in Nykøbing Falster and later worked as an assistant in the Ministry of Defence.

== Career ==
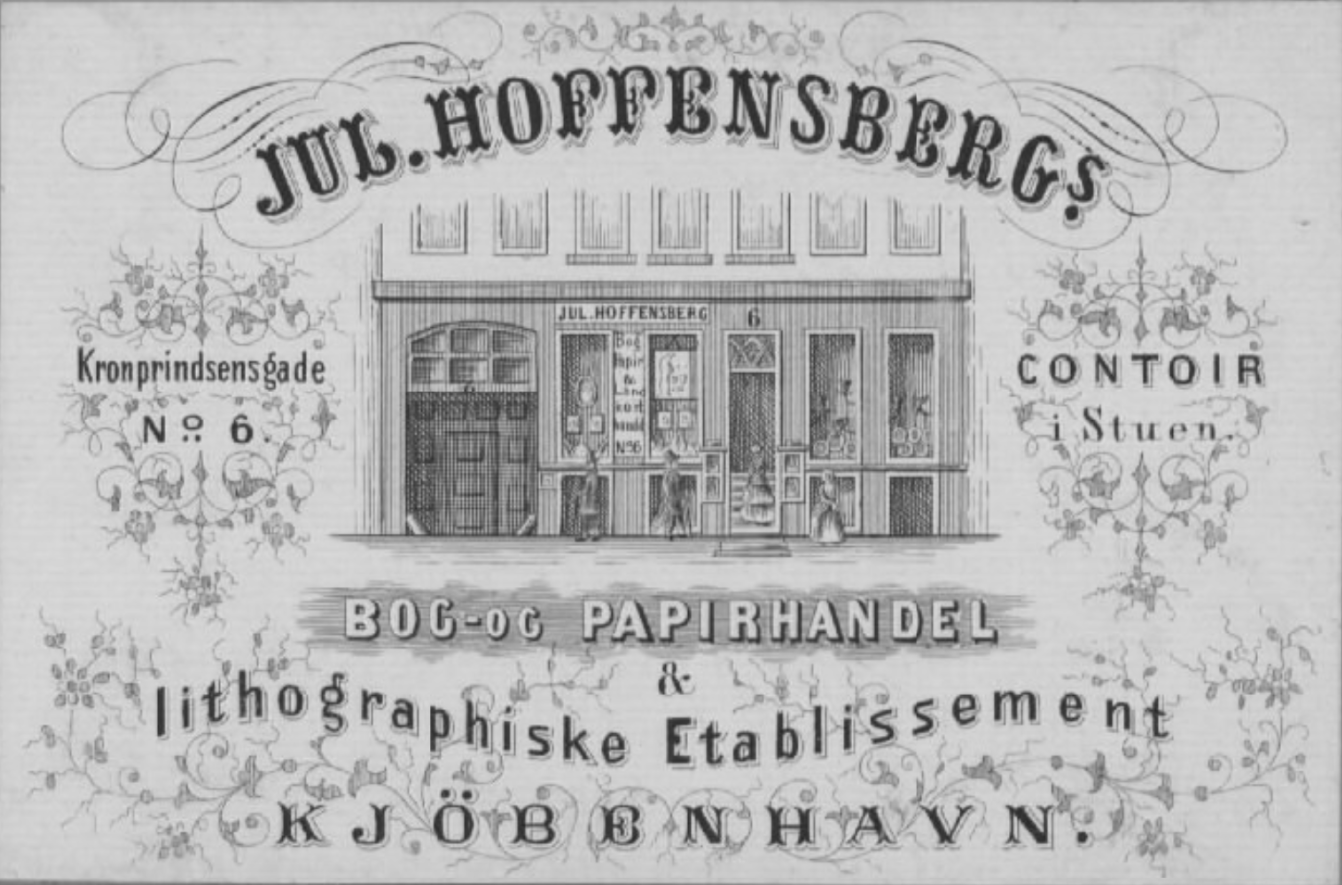
Kronprinsensgade 6: Jul. Hoffenbergs Bog- og Papirhandel & lithographiske Etablissement.png

In 1855, Hoffensberg took over a lithographic business established by his father in approximately 1844. The firm merged with Otto Schwartz' Eftf.s (E. Jespersens) book shop and Em. Bærentzen & Co.'s lithographic workshop under the name Hoffensberg, Jespersen og Trap in 1874. The firm also acquired G. S. Wibe's book printing business. Its name was changed to Hoffensberg & Fr. Trap in 1878. Hoffensberg headed the firm and was its sole owner in 1882–87. An eye disease forced him to retire in 1888. The firm was two years later converted into an aktieselskab under the name Det Hoffensbergske Etablissement. It was liquidized in 1972.

Hoffensberg and N. K. Strøyberg were in around 1769 also the owners of Silkeborg Paper Factory.

== Personal life ==
Julius Hoffensberg married twice. Jis first wife was Emilie Mathilde Barbara Fahrner (1836-1871), a daughter of master tailor and later owner of Bavnegård at Gentofte Michael Fahrner (ca. 1805–55) and Maria Catharina Hansen (c. 1795–1865). They married on 8 February 1861 in the Church of Our Lady in Copenhagen. His second wife was Emma Josephine Margrethe Withusen (1835-1926), a daughter of farmer Peter Nielsen Withusen (Berring) of Rygård at Hellerup (c. 1806–47) and Emilie Jacobine Klepser (c. 1811–95). They married on 19 November 1872.

Hoffensberg died on 28 March 1895 and is buried at Gentofte Cemetery.
