= C. R. Evers & Co. =

Confectionery company

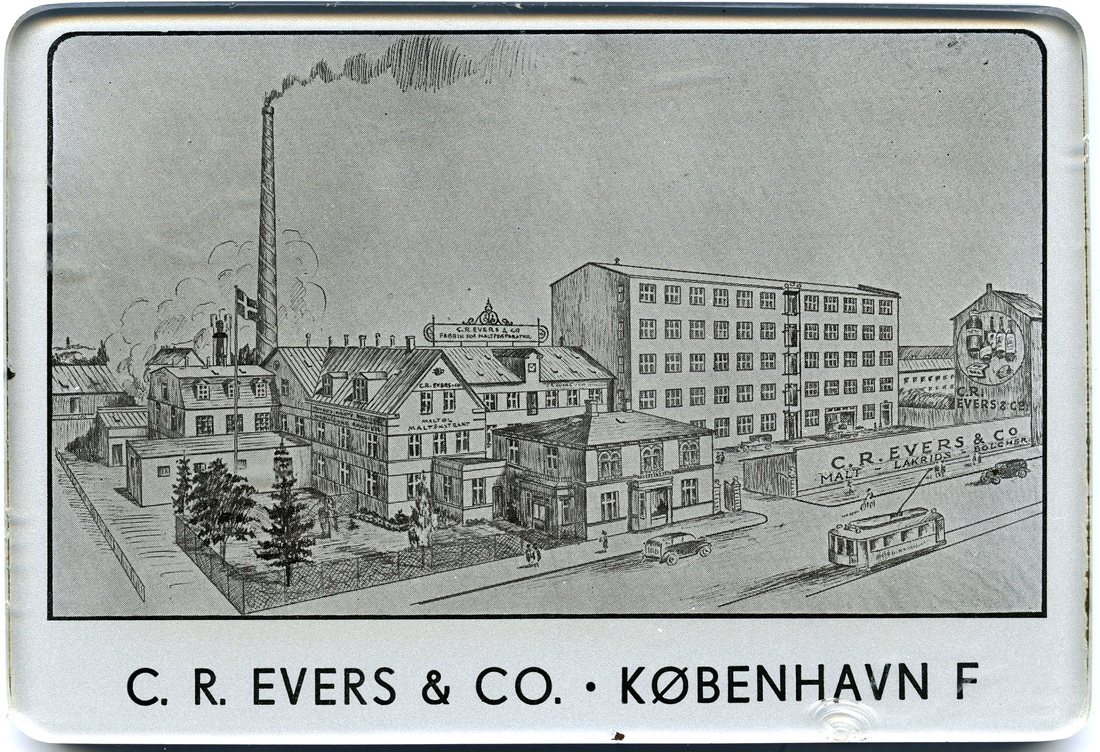
C. R. Evers & Co.'s factory in Copenhagen

C. R. Evers & Co. was a Danish confectionery company based in Copenhagen, Denmark. The Evers brand is now owned by Carletti.

== History ==
C.R. Evers & Co. was founded by Christian Rudolph Evers (1821-1877) in 1867. Educated as a pharmacist in 1843, had later worked first as a merchant in Vejle and then as a brewer and manufacturer of candles in Ribe. In 1984 he was granted a royal monopoly on the production of a malt extract of his own invention. The malt extract came in a small tin box and was used for a preparation of a "tasty, potent beer-like drink". He was that same year also granted a patent on the malt extract in Sweden, Belgium, France, Austria and Hungary. The name C.R. Evers & Co. was adopted when the cost of obtaining these patents forced him to enter into a partnership with other investors.

Evers' widow continued the company after his death in 1877. She completed a new factory on Peder Skrams Gade in Copenhagen's new Gammelholm neighbourhood.

Helmuth Brix acquired the company in 1886. He inaugurated a new factory at Østre Fasanvej 15 (now Nordre Fasanvej 101) in 1896. Illustreret Tidende brought an article about the company in connection with its 40th anniversary.

The company was in 1924 acquired by A. Fredsted (born 1887) and C. Fjeldborg (born 1879). The company was later in the century subject to a number of mergers and disappeared in the 1990s. The Evers brand is now owned by Carletti.

== Cultural references ==
In Hans Scherfig's Stolen Spring, it is a poisoned Evers Melt Drop that causes the sudden death of C. Blomme.
