= Arent Nicolai Dragsted =

Danish goldsmith

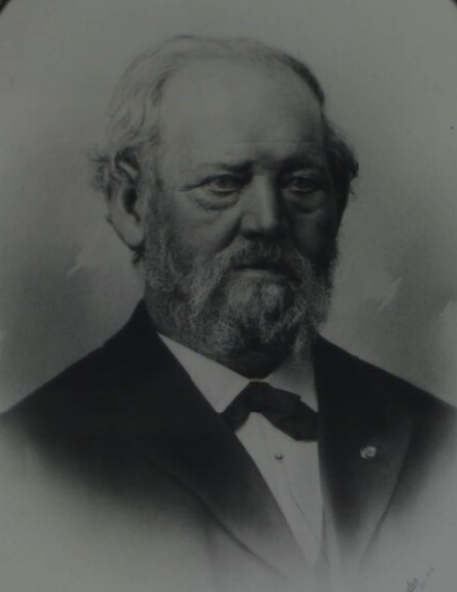
- Born: 9 June 1821; Kerteminde, Denmark
- Died: 15 August 1898 (aged 77); Copenhagen, Denmark
- Occupation: Goldsmith

Arent Nicolai Dragsted (9 June 1821 – 15 August 1898) was a Danish goldsmith based in Copenhagen who was granted the predicate Purveyor to the Court of Denmark shortly before his death. His company, A. Dragsted, still exists today. Dragsted created the golden horn that was presented to Bernhard Severin Ingemann by Danish women on the occasion of his 75th birthday. The horn is now on display in the Danish Museum of National History at Frederiksborg Castle in Hillerød. He also created the golden wreath for Frederick VIIøs sarcofague in Roskilde Cathedral.

== Early life and education ==
Dragsted was born in 1821 in Kerteminde on Funen, the son of Mathias Nicolai Dragsted (1790-1873) and Frandsine Dragsted née Roed (1697-1867). He apprenticed as a goldsmith in his home town and later enrolled at the School of Drawing of the Royal Danish Academy of Fine Arts in Copenhagen where he studied under Herman Wilhelm Bissen and Gustav Friedrich Hetsch.

== Career ==
Dragsted established his own workshop in Bredgade in 1854. He was highly respected for his work, especially as a chaser. He ended his career as alderman of the Goldsmiths' Guild in Copenhagen. He was granted the predicate Purveyor to the Court of Denmark shortly before his death.

== Works ==
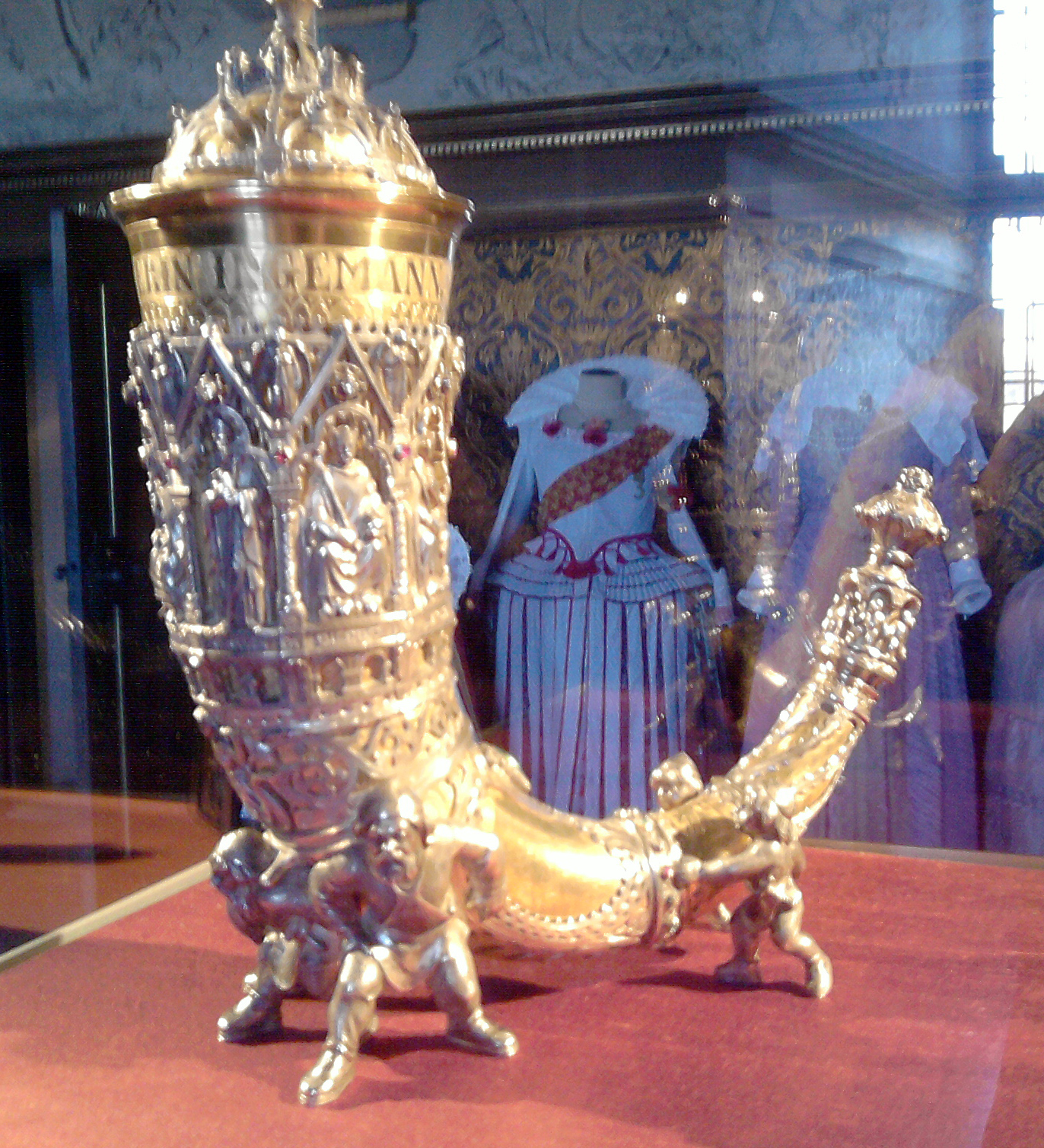
B.S. Ingemann's golden horn

Dragsted created the golden horn that was presented to Bernhard Severin Ingemann by Danish women on the occasion of his 75th birthday. He also created the golden wreath for Frederick VII's sarcophagus in Roskilde Cathedral.

== Personal life ==
Dragsted married Ane Marie Bech (1825-1861). They had two sons, Frantz M. N. Dragsted (1853-1916) and Alfred Dragsted.

Arent Nicolai Dragsted died in 1891. He is buried in Gentofte Cemetery in Gentofte.

== See also ==
- Jørgen Balthasar Dalhoff
