= Anthon Berg =

Danish chocolatier; brand of Toms International

- Company type: Privately held company
- Industry: Confectionery production
- Founded: 1884; 142 years ago
- Founder: Anthon Berg; Gustav Anthon Berg
- Headquarters: Ballerup, Denmark
- Area served: Worldwide
- Products: Chocolates
- Parent: Toms International
- Website: www.anthonberg.dk

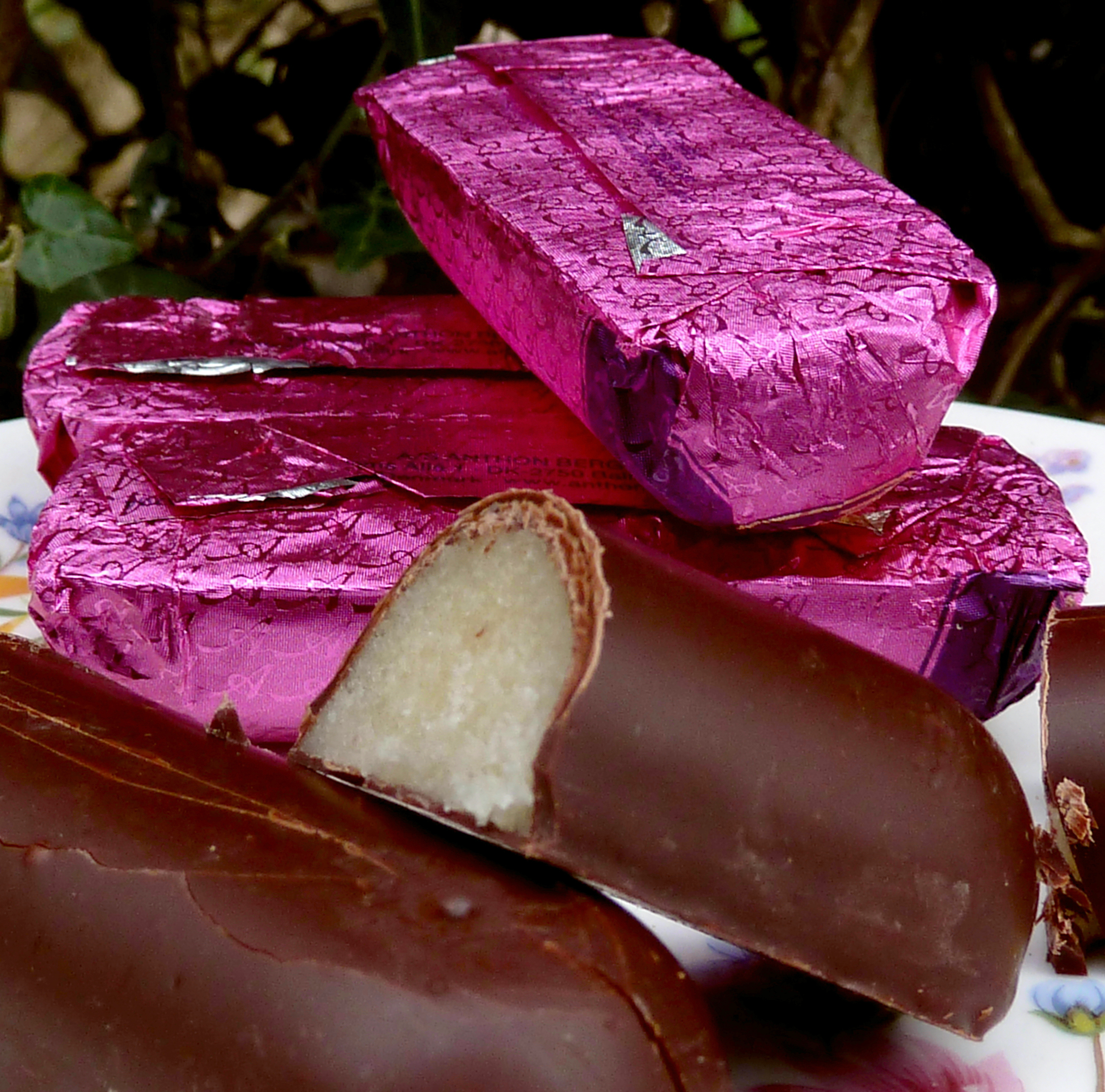
Chocolate-covered marzipan by Anthon Berg

Anthon Berg is a Danish chocolatier and the name of a corporate division within Toms International. The company produces a diverse variety of chocolate products. The title "Purveyors to the Royal Danish Court" was awarded to Anthon Berg in 1957.

== History ==
Cocoa became known in Denmark around the 18th century. For years it was seen mostly as a pharmaceutical product; the Danish founders of the leading chocolate houses, Toms, Trojel and Meyer, were all pharmacists.

As marzipan was already a coveted delicacy in Denmark, Anthon Berg, a Danish greengrocer, decided to try his hand at making marzipan. With his own name as a trademark, he created a crafts shop on the Old Strand in Copenhagen. In 1884, he bought a confectionery business and with his son Gustav as assistant, began producing filled dessert chocolates.

The marzipan had initially been made by Anthon Berg in order to appease queuing and waiting customers. In 1898, it was put into production as an independent product. In 1901, Gustav took over the business and expanded nationwide with approximately 200 employees.

In 1938, when Gustav Berg died, Kai Berg became director. In 1954, Toms (Victor B. Strand) bought the company, which was at this time in Teglværksgade on Østerbro. In 1962, the entire production was consolidated at the Toms plant in Ballerup, designed by Arne Jacobsen. Today, their products include plain chocolate bars, mini chocolate bars with fillings such as nougat and marzipan, chocolate bonbons, boxes of chocolates, Robin's Eggs and tea cakes with a plum and Madeira wine paste filling.
