= Spunk (candy) =

Danish candy

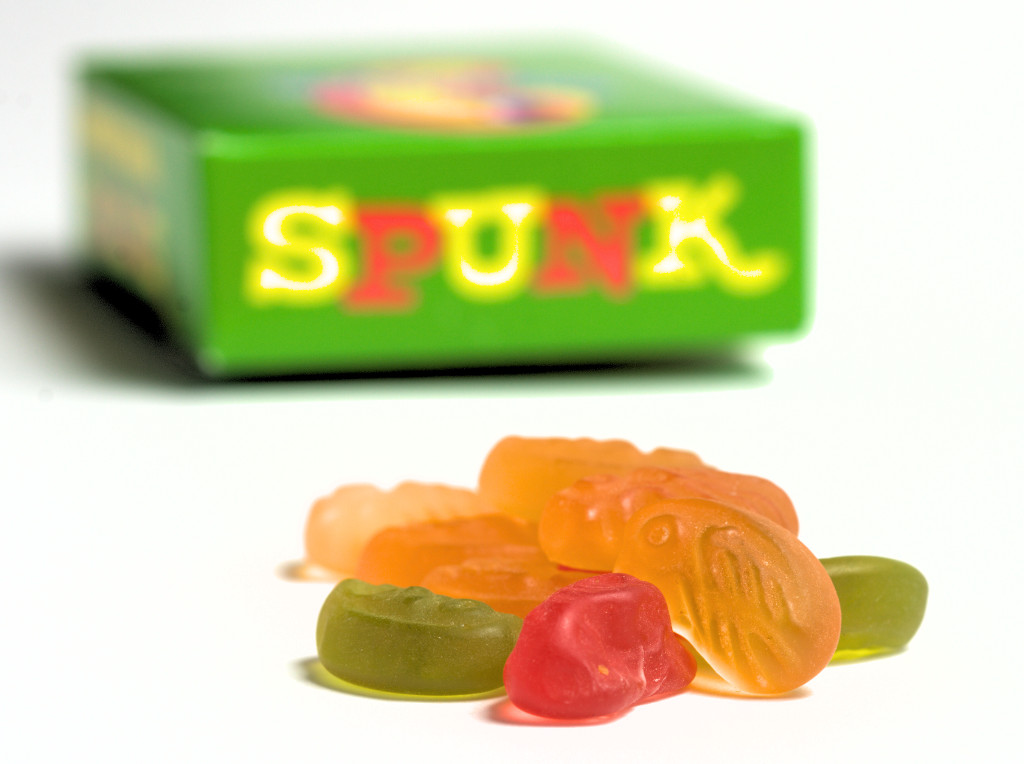
- Spunk wine gums
- Type: Confectionery
- Place of origin: Denmark
- Created by: Tor Frederikson, Galle & Jessen

Spunk is a brand of Danish candy, launched in 1971 by Danish candy manufacturers Galle & Jessen and commonly sold in Denmark and Germany.

== History ==
In 1971 Galle & Jessen were looking for a name for their new candy. They came across the name "Spunk" in the Pippi Longstocking book (via episode 9 of the TV series of 1969 named Pippi in the South Seas), in which Pippi invents a word for which she can find no use. The boxes bear the name Spunk and a drawing of a "fantasy animal" made by an 8-year-old girl. As with the Danish Ga-Jol pastilles (also produced by Galle & Jessen), the boxes have a little saying or word of advice on the inside of the box lid.

== Varieties ==
Spunk comes in three versions:

- pastilles made from salty liquorice and sold in a black box
- wine gums of four different flavours and colours—red, yellow, green, and orange—sold in a green box
- brown cola-flavoured wine gums sold in a brown box

Each box contains 20 or 23 grams of candy.
