= Snorrebroens Pakhus =

Building in Copenhagen

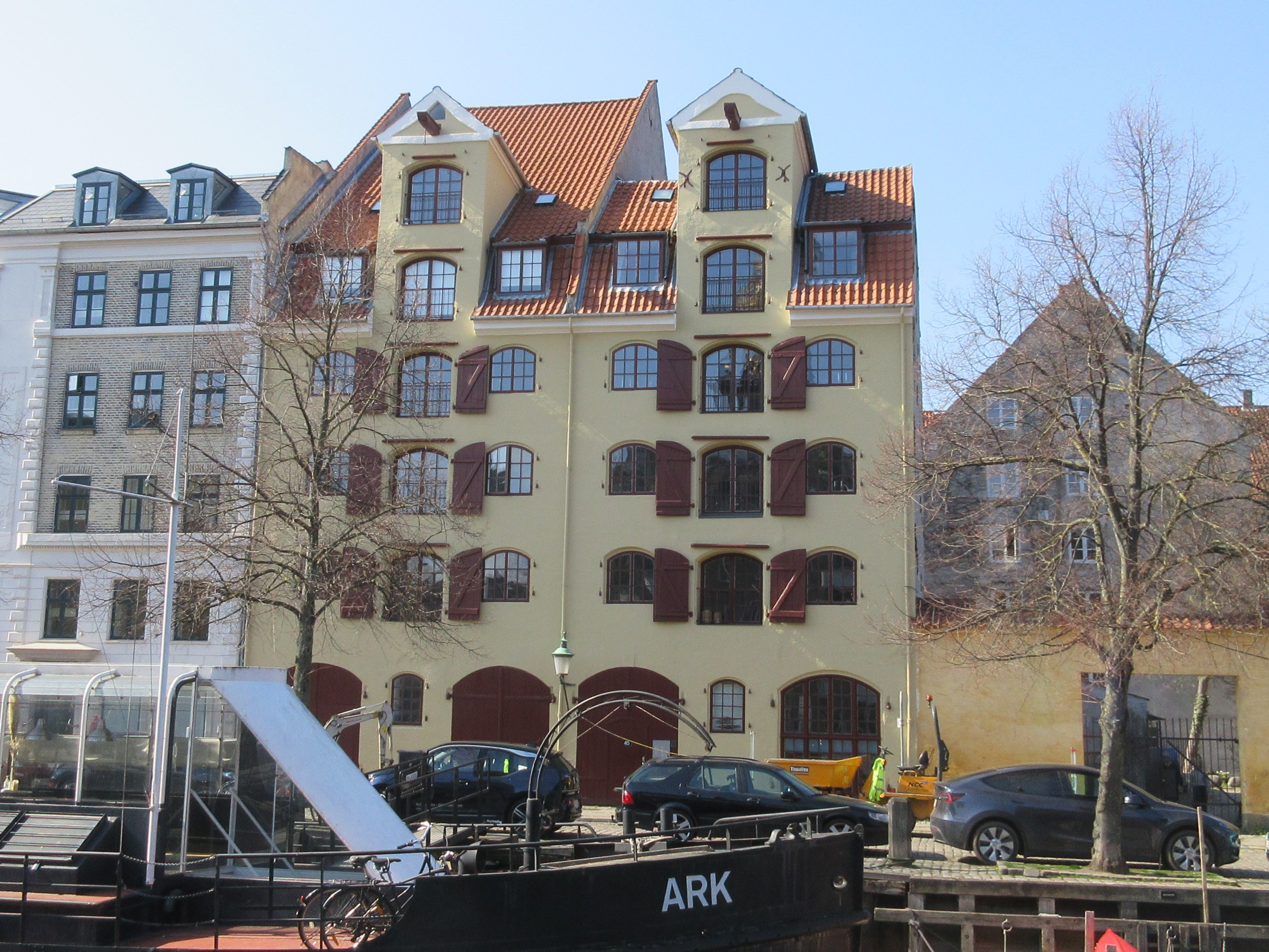
- The warehouse
- Interactive map of the Snorrebroens Pakhus area

General information
- Location: Copenhagen, Denmark
- Coordinates: 55°40′25.55″N 12°35′32.25″E
- Inaugurated: 1801
- Client: Niels Brock

The Snorrebroens Pakhus, located at Overgaden Neden Vandet 45–47, is a former warehouse overlooking Christianshavn Canal in the Christianshavn neighbourhood of Copenhagen, Denmark. It consists of what was originally two individual but almost identical warehouses from circa 1800 which were merged into one building in the 1860s and has now been converted into apartments. The name, which is of modern origins, refers to Snorrebroen, the bridge that reaches nearby Sankt Annæ Gade across the canal.

== History ==
=== No. 47. 1800–1863 ===
The warehouse to the right (No. 47) is slightly older than the warehouse to the left (No. 45). It was built in 1799–1800 for Hartvig Marcus Frisch, who was director of the Royal Greenland Trade Department. The Frisch House, Frisch's former home at Nytorv, was built around the same time.

=== No. 45, 1801–1863 ===
The warehouse at No. 45 was built in 1800–1801 for the merchant Jens Bay Perch. He traded in colonial goods from the nearby Danish Asiatic Company, but died on 3 July 1800 before the warehouse was completed. He is buried inside the Church of Our Saviour, where his gravestone is one of only five stones that were not removed in 1817. Perch was a close friend of Niels Brock. His son, who was given the name Niels Brock Perch after the friend, would later found the Perch Tea House.

The warehouse was owned by Friederich Tutein from 1717 until 1841. Tutein was also the owner of another of another warehouse at Wildersgade 62.

=== 1863 merger ===
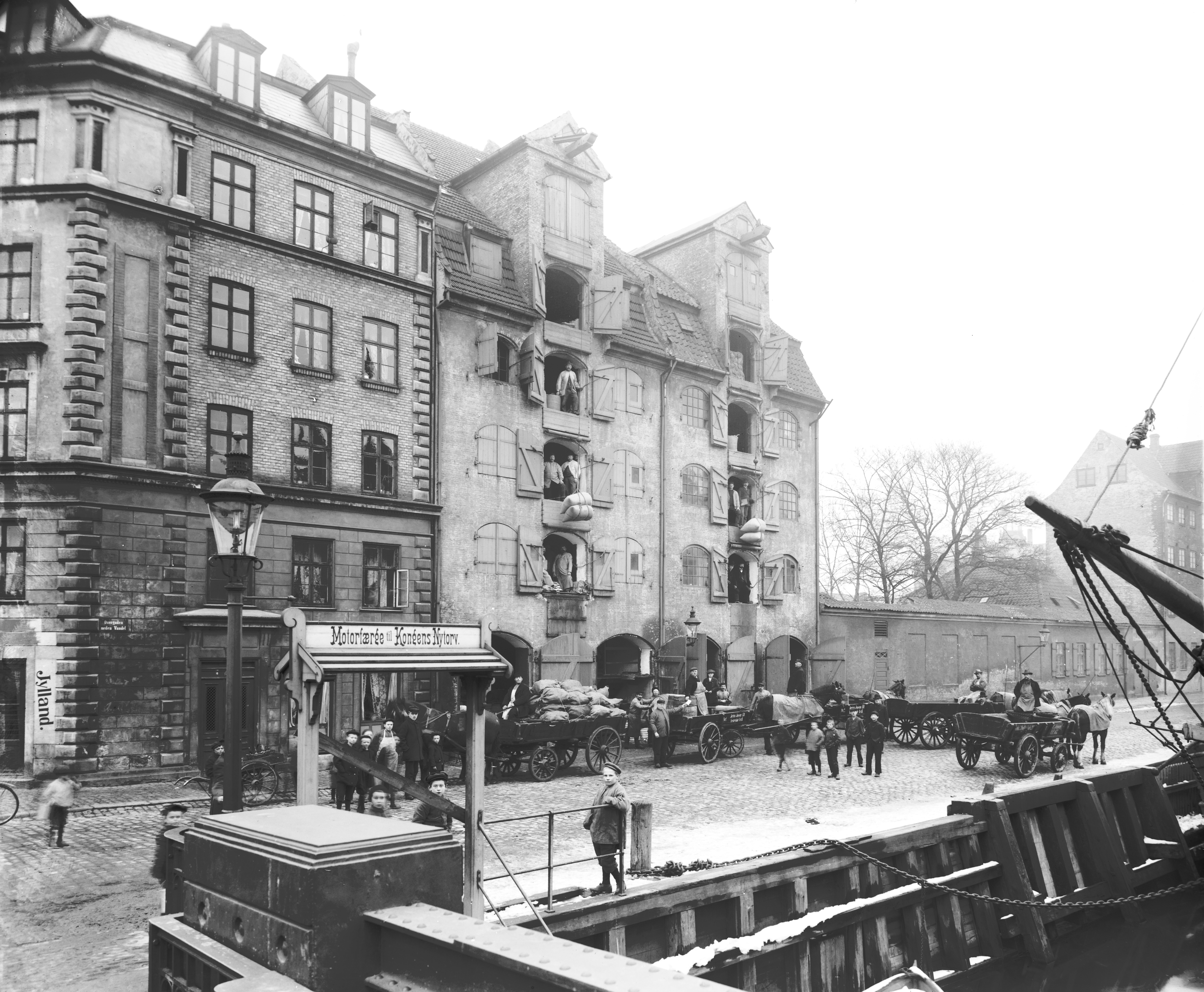
Jørgen Jensen's warehouse, photographed by Johannes Hauerslev

In 1863, the two warehouses came under the same owner. An interior renovation merged them into one building. The building was listed in 1945. The building was converted into apartments by Dissing + Weitling between 1979 and 1987. The renovation received an award from Copenhagen Municipality in 1994.

== Architecture ==
The exterior has undergone few changes, and its origin as two individual warehouses is still clearly visible. The building stands on a foundation of sandstone from Bornholm and consists of three storeys and a mansard roof with two two-storey wall dormers. Each half of the building has a central row of large, arched opening with shutters, flanked by two rows of arched windows. Remains of the hoist are still seen on the dormers.

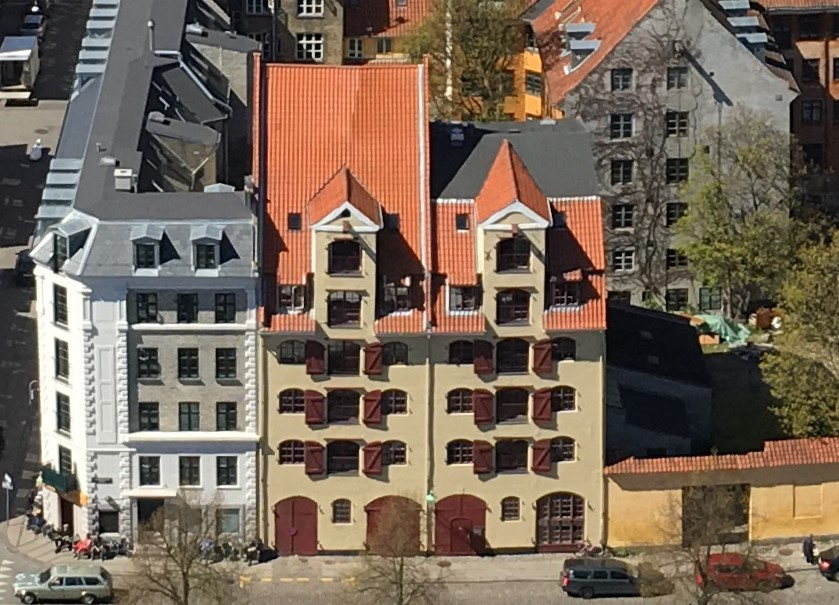
The building viewed from the tower of Church of Our Saviour

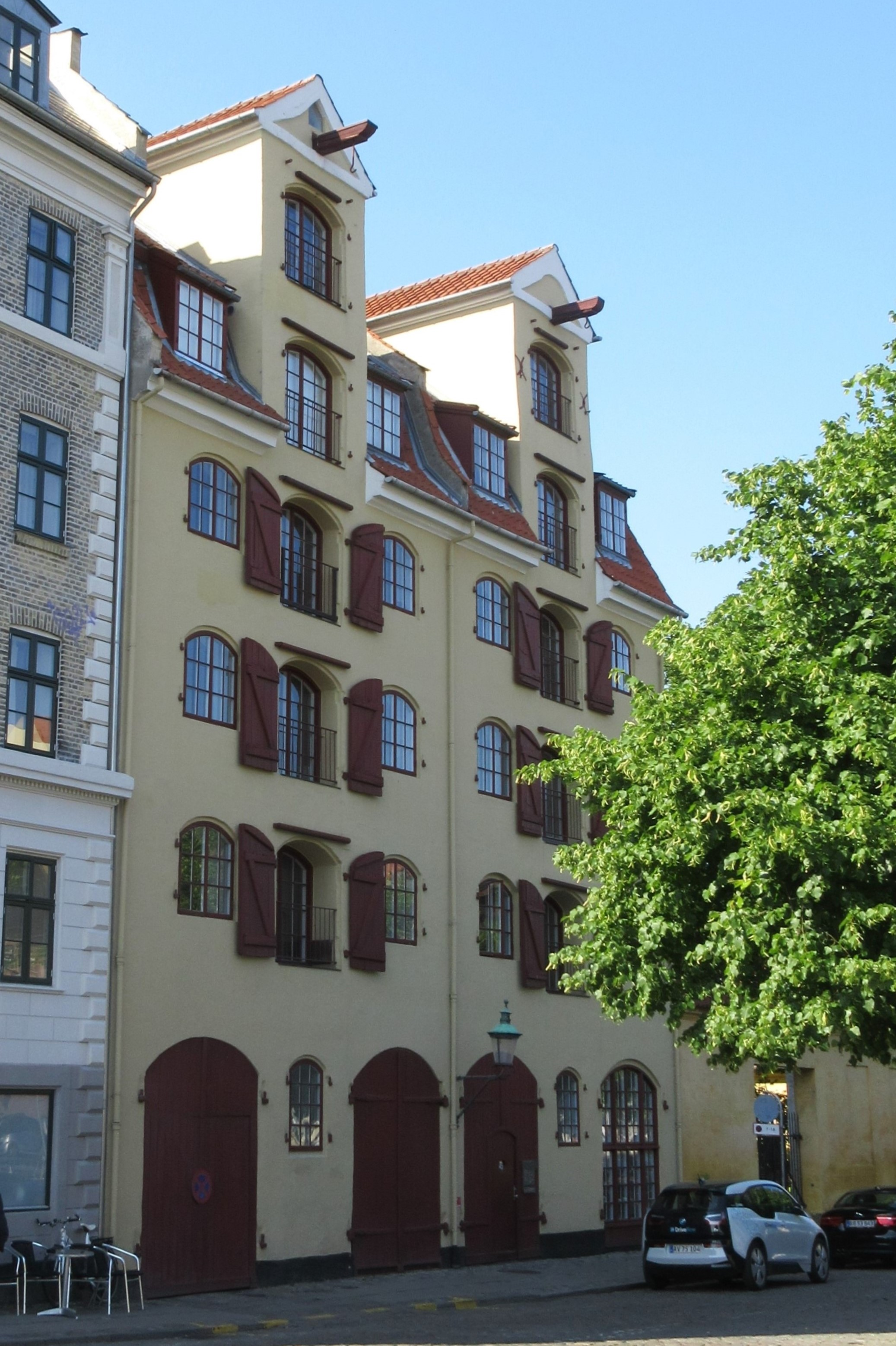
The building viewed from the quay
