= Jacob Holm House =

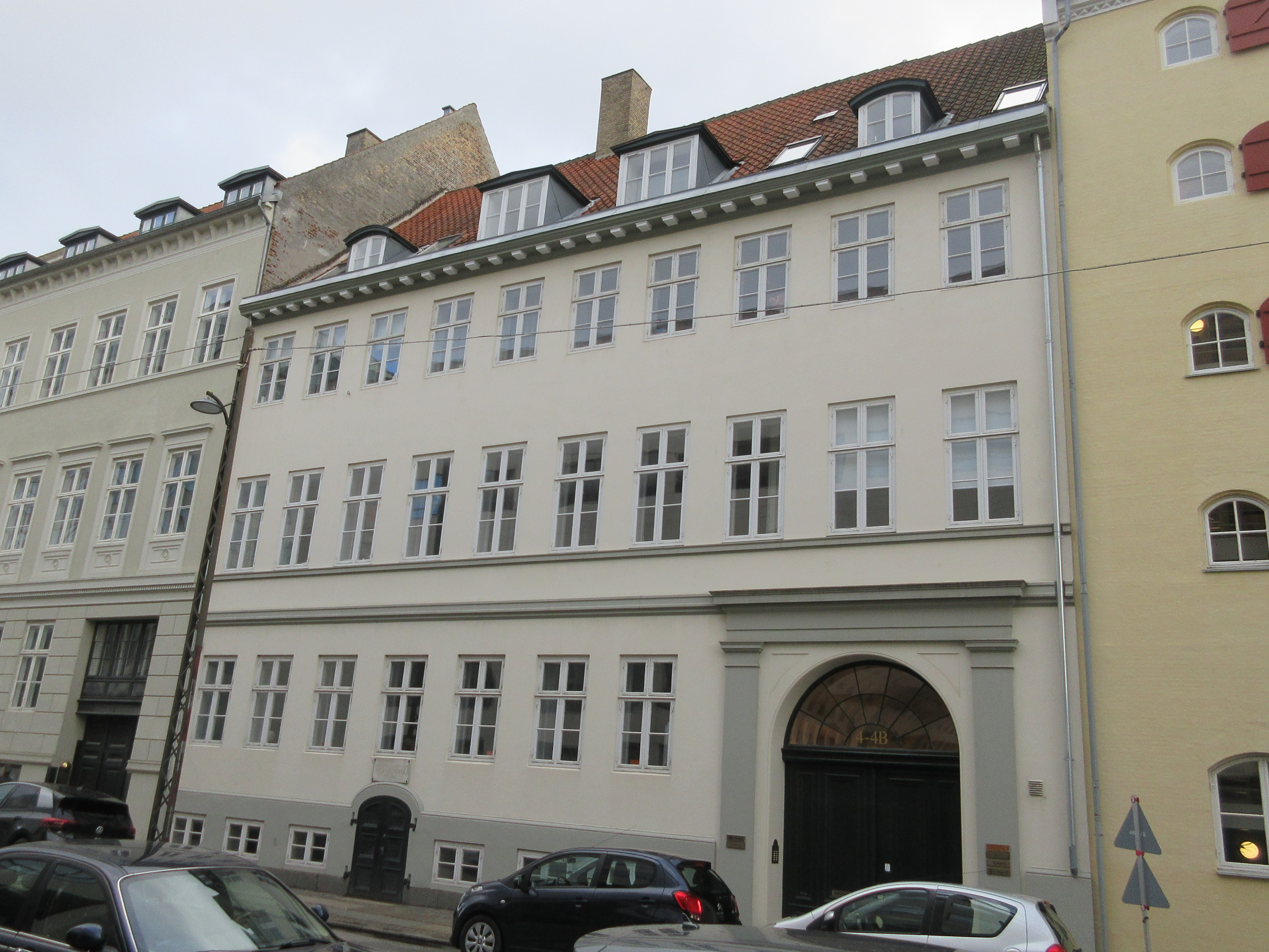
- The Jacob Holm House

General information
- Location: Copenhagen, Denmark
- Coordinates: 55°40′22.15″N 12°35′17.3″E
- Inaugurated: 1680s

The Jacob Holm House is a historic property located at Strandgade 4B in the Christianshavn neighbourhood of Copenhagen, Denmark. It was owned by the wealthy industrialist and shipowner Jacob Holm from 1819 to 1845. The building remained in the hands of the Holm family for more than 100 years. A plaque on the facade commemorates that N. F. S. Grundtvig was a tenant on the building.

== Architecture ==
=== 16th and 18th centuries ===
It is unclear when the house was built and for whom, but it was refurbished in the 1680s. It was probably a comprehensive refurbishment since some sources refer to it as a "new house". Early owners of the property included Johan de Willom and Jonas Trellun, both of whom unsuccessfully attempted to participate in the lucrative trade in the Danish West Indies.

The building was then part of a much larger property listed as No. 14 in Christianshavn Quarter in Vopenhagen's first cadastre of 1689. It was at that time owned by Frederik Møller. The property was divided into two separate properties in 1689.

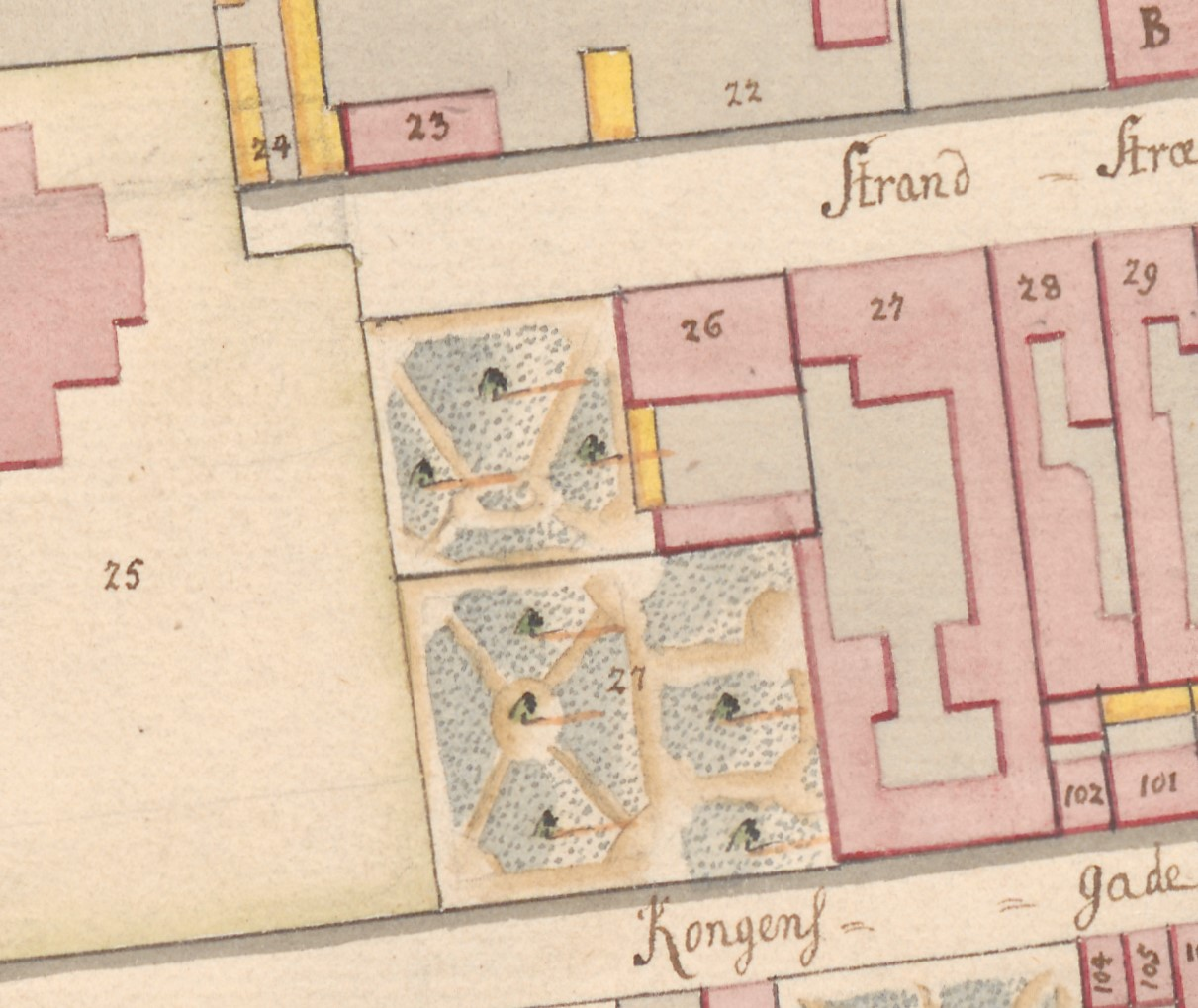
No. 24 seen in a detail from Christian Gedde's map of Christianshavn Quarter, 1757

The site was individually listed as No. 26 in the new cadastre of 1756. It was at that time owned by pastor Johan Paul Dupaget.

The property was acquired by merchant (grosserer) Bertel Madsen (1751–1806) in 1782. He and his father Lars Madsen (1723–1781) completed a total of 123 voyages to the Danish West Indies with their own fleet of merchant ships. Madsen constructed a large new warehouse on the southern part of his new property.

The property was listed as No. 56 in the new cadastre of 1806. It was at that time owned by merchant (grosserer) Anders Kyhn.

The property was later owned by the businessmen (grosserer) Johan David Vogel and Grosserer Frants Thestrup Adolph. On 28 August 1819, their property was sold at auction for 31m000 rigsdaler silver.

=== Jacob Holm and his family ===
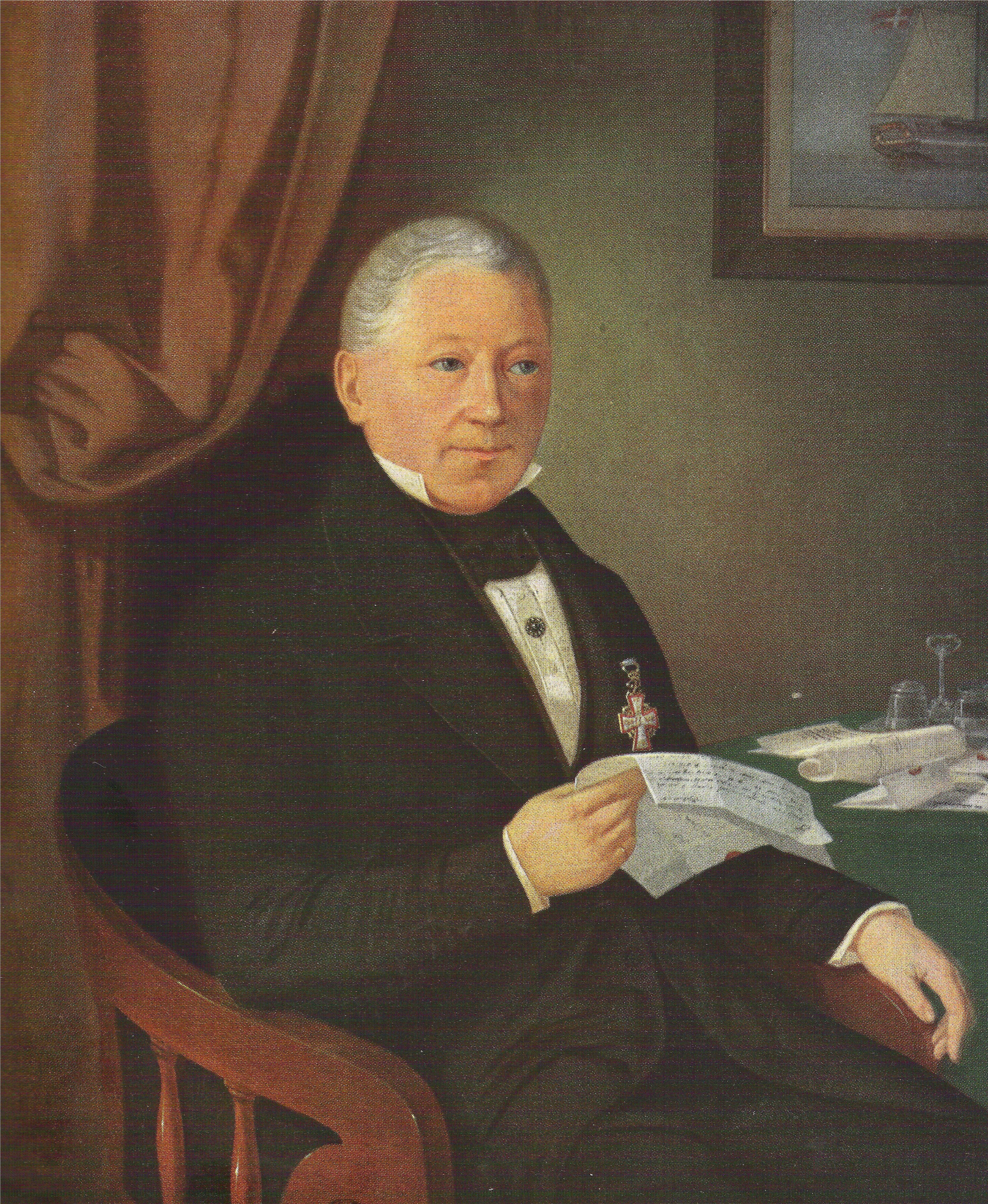
Jacob Holm in 1834

The new owner of the property was Jacob Holm. The property comprised a three-storey building fronting the street, a warehouse on its right, a combined carriage house and stable to the left in the courtyard (with stabling for six horses) and a henhouse to the right in the courtyard. Holm had lived at Strandgade 8 since 1811 and prior to that in a now demolished building at Rorvegade. In 1814, he had established a shipyard at Wilders Plads. In 1833, he purchased Applebys Plads. Holm made several changes to the house and lived in it with his family until his death in 1845, The priest N.F.S. Grundtvig lived on the third floor as a tenant from 1829 to 1840. Grundtvig had previously been priest at Church of Our Saviour from 1722 to 1826.

In 1836, Holm took his sons Georg Holm (1803–1867), Ludvig Holm (1804–1858) and Christian Holm (1807–1876) as partners in the firm.

The property was home to 21 residents in two households at the 1840 census. Jacob Holm resided on the first floor with his wife Ane Margrethe Holm, five of their children (aged 21 to 27), a 48-year old unmarried woman named Heidemann, three male servants and three maids. Grundtvig, who then served as priest at the Hospital of the Holy Ghost, resided on the second floor with his wife Elisabeth Christine Margrethe Blicher, their three children (aged 13 to 18), his sister-in-law Jane Mathia Blicher and one maid.

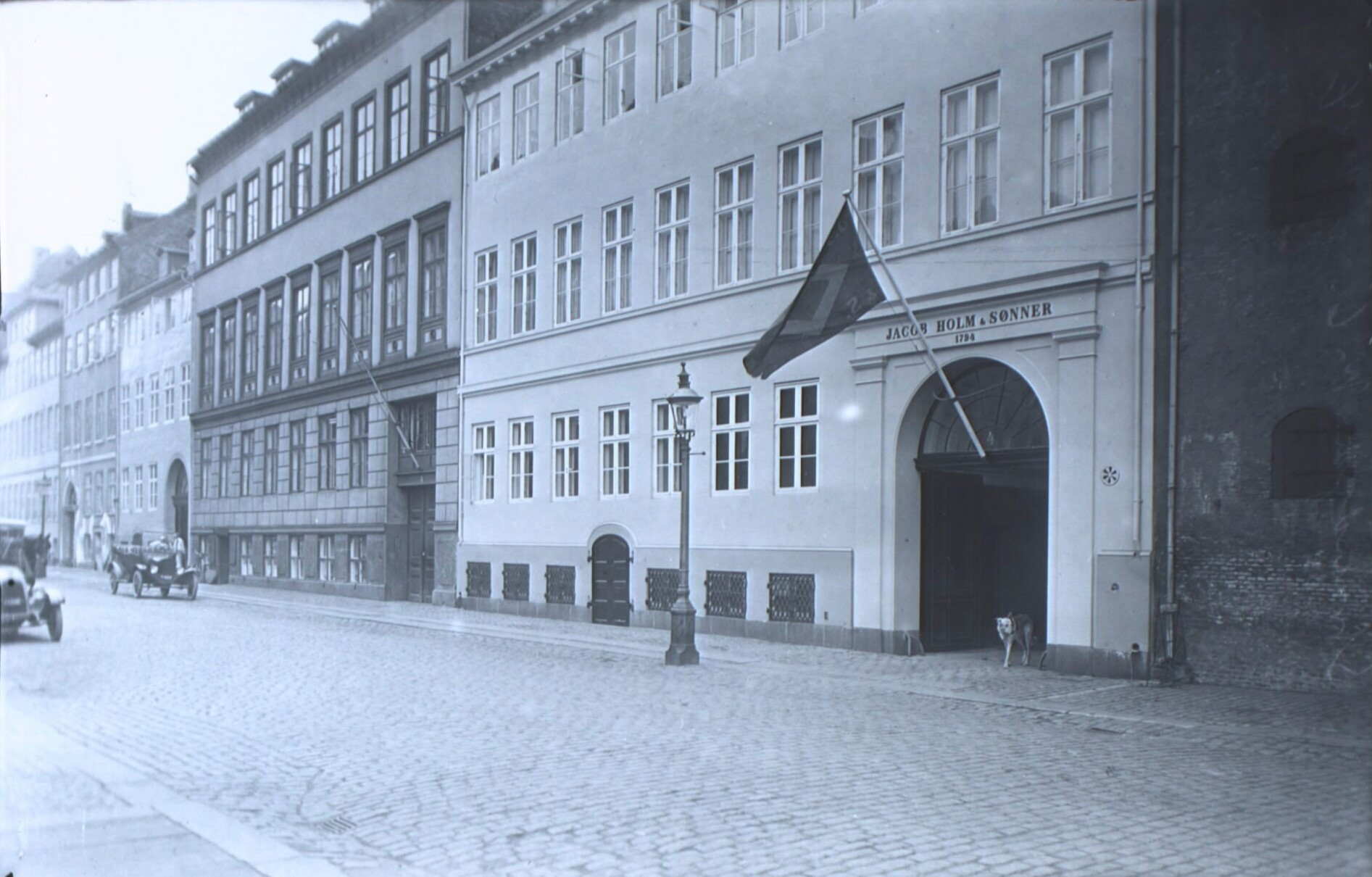
Jacob Holm & Sønner

Jacob Holm died in 1945. His widow kept the property after his death. In April 1849, Grundtvig moved to a second floor apartment at Vimmelskaftet 49. The property in Strandgade was again home to two households at the 1850 census. Anne Margrethe Holm resided on the first floor with three unmarried daughters (aged 20 to 30), 58-year old Cathrine Heidemann (married but with no mention of her husband) and 17-year-old Amalie Kirkerup. Ludvig Holm, a merchant (grosserer), resided in another apartment with his wife Edel Holm, their four children (aged 11 to 14), two male servants, two maids and four other residents (status unspecified).

=== Burmeister & Wain ===
The building served as headquarters of Jacob Holm & Sønner well into the 20th century.

== Architecture ==
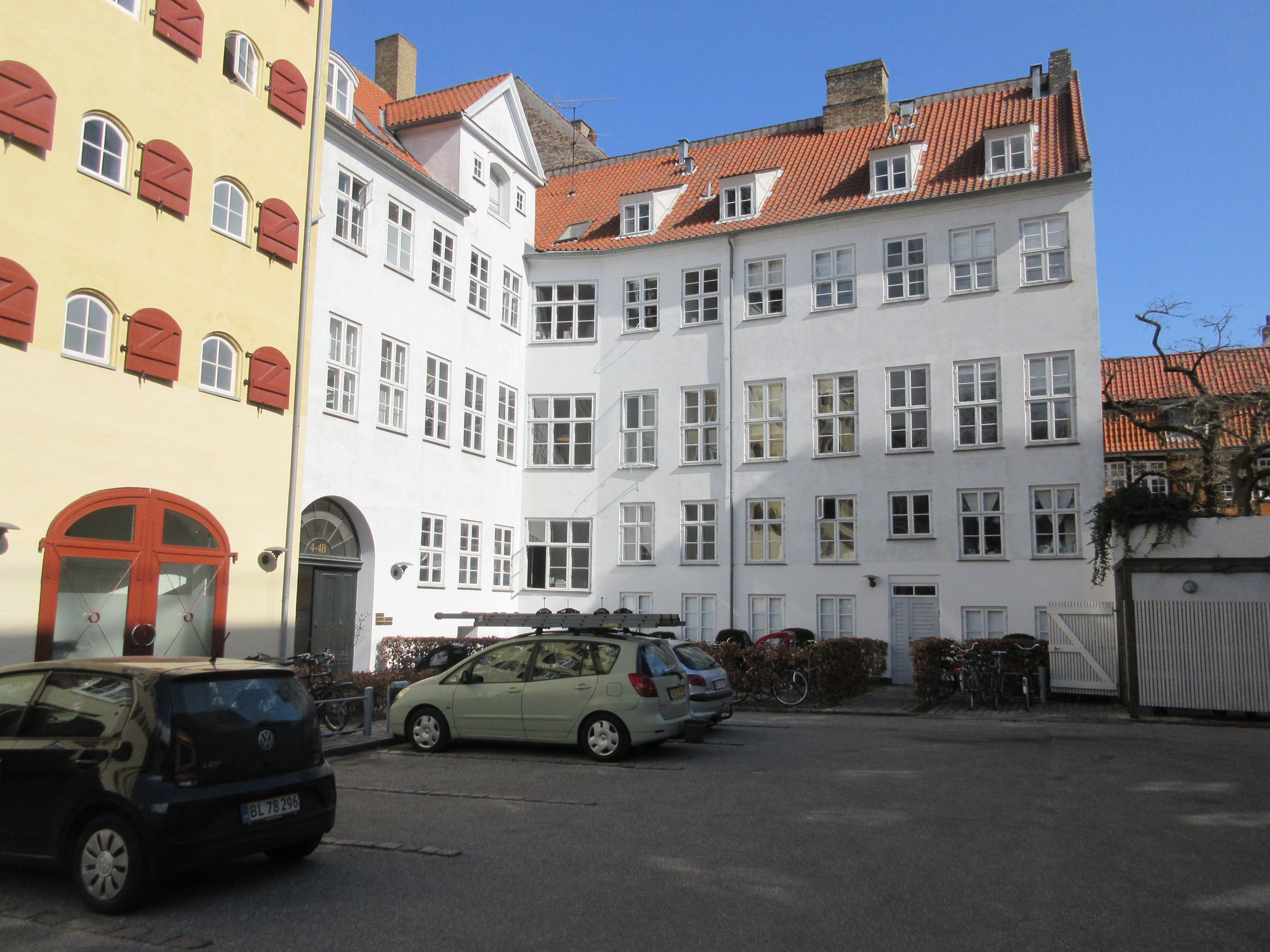
The building seen from the courtyard

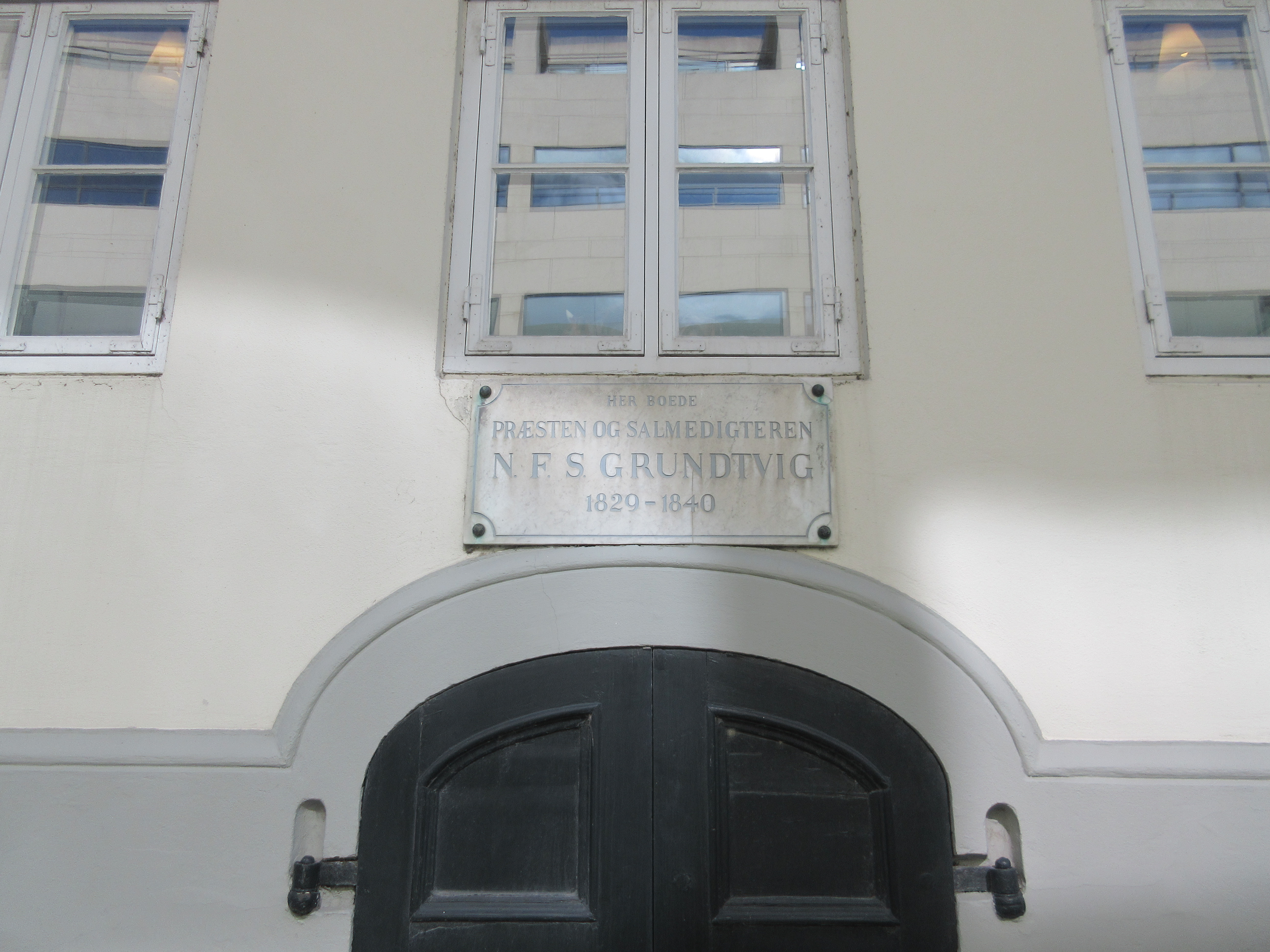
Grundtvig commemorative plaque

The house is ten bays wide. A plaque above the entrance to the cellar commemorates that Grundtvig used to live in the building.
