= Shola Carletti =

Italian painter (fl. 21st century)

Shola Mara Carletti (born in Pesaro; fl. 21st century) is an Italian painter, sculptor and former graphic designer, best known for her abstract and modern art inspired by spirituality in India, and alternative spirituality, particularly that of Osho in Pune. A graduate of the Istituto Superiore per le Industrie Artistiche in Urbino, her works have been exhibited at the Jehangir Art Gallery in 2016. She owns an art studio in Koregaon Park, Pune, India. She also works with Art Galleries and collaborates with architect/interior designers in the UAE and India.

== Publications ==
- Embracing Diversity. Art & Soul. 2009.
