= Yankie Bar =

Danish chocolate bar

- Type: Chocolate Bar
- Place of origin: Denmark
- Created by: Victor B. Strand
- Invented: 1946
- Main ingredients: Caramel, nougat, and chocolate
- Variations: Yankie Bar Lakrids (liquorice), Yankie Bar Mandel (almond), Yankie Bar Orange, Holly Bar
- Similar dishes: Mars Bar

The Yankie Bar is a caramel, nougat, and milk chocolate bar produced and sold in Denmark by Toms International.

== History ==
Just after the Second World War, Danish candy producer Toms were contacted by the United States high command in Germany, which commissioned Toms to produce a candy bar for the American troops in Germany to avoid transporting such products across the Atlantic. In return, the U.S. would supply Toms with the required amount of cocoa beans. The chocolate bar was named Yankie Bar after the American soldiers (Yankees). The spelling with "-ie" was chosen to avoid Danes mispronouncing "-ee". Ten years later, in 1956, Toms launched the Holly Bar, similar to the Yankie bar, but with white nougat and roasted hazelnuts.

In its marketing, Toms relied on Americophilia to sell the Yankie Bar. The brand was damaged by the Vietnam War, when "yankees go home" became a common anti-American chant, but its popularity rebounded after the war ended. During the presidency of Jimmy Carter, Toms launched an advertising campaign featuring a lookalike of the president.

The Yankie Bar is similar to the European version of the Mars Bar.
