= Massimiliano Carletti =

Italian footballer (born 1973)

Personal information
- Date of birth: 8 November 1973 (age 52)
- Place of birth: Foligno, Italy
- Height: 1.85 m (6 ft 1 in)
- Position: Goalkeeper

Senior career*
Years	Team	Apps	(Gls)
1999–2000	Bastia	26	(0)
2000–2002	Cesi	38	(0)
2002–2004	Foligno	45	(0)
2004–2005	Virgilio Maroso		
2005–2006	Foligno	3	(0)
2006–2007	Massa Martana		
2007–2008	Grifoponte Torgiano	18	(0)
2008–2009	Gualdo	46	(0)
- * Club domestic league appearances and goals

Massimiliano Carletti (born 8 November 1973) is an Italian former football goalkeeper. He made three appearances in Serie C2 for Foligno Calcio.
