= Toms International =

Danish producer of chocolate, liquorice and sugar confectionery

- Type: Privately held company
- Industry: Confectionery production
- Founded: 1924
- Founder: Hans Trojel; Victor Hans Meyer
- Headquarters: Ballerup, Denmark
- Area served: Worldwide
- Key people: Annette Zeipel (CEO)
- Products: Chocolates, liquorice and sugar confectionery
- Revenue: DKK 1.6 billion (2021)
- Net income: DKK 80 million (2021)
- Subsidiaries: Anthon Berg
- Website: tomsgroup.com

Toms International is a Danish chocolate, liquorice and sugar confectionery producer, headquartered in Ballerup, Denmark. The company produces around 50,000 tons of chocolate and sugar confectionery annually which it supplies to customers in Denmark, Sweden, Norway, The Netherlands and the United Kingdom. The company employs around 1,200–1,700 people, depending on the season, and in 2021 generated revenues of DKK 1.6 billion.

== History ==
Founded in 1924 as Tom Chokoladefabrik A/S by Copenhagen chemists Hans Trojel and Victor Hans Meyer, the company is now a chocolate producer. Originally the chocolate was a side item for sale in the chemists' retail shop on Vesterbrogade in Copenhagen, the founders launched their own products on Prags Boulevard between 1925 and 1929.

The company was taken over by Victor B. Strand in 1942, who acquired the chocolate company Anthon Berg shortly after. In 1961, a new factory was designed by the famous Danish modernist architect Arne Jacobsen and consisted of a 22,000 m^{2} factory hall and a 3,000 m^{2} administration building on a site measuring 220,000 m^{2}.

Around the time of the factory's completion in 1962, Toms acquired A/S J. Høeghs Lakrids og Sukkervarefabrikker, which shortly was renamed Pingvin Lakrids. Toms' final acquisition was that of A/S Galle & Jessen, in 1971.

In 2011, Toms acquired German company Hanseatische Chocolade GmbH and with it the company and chocolate brand Hachez.

== Ownership ==
The company is fully owned by Gerda og Victor B. Strands Fond.

== Brands ==
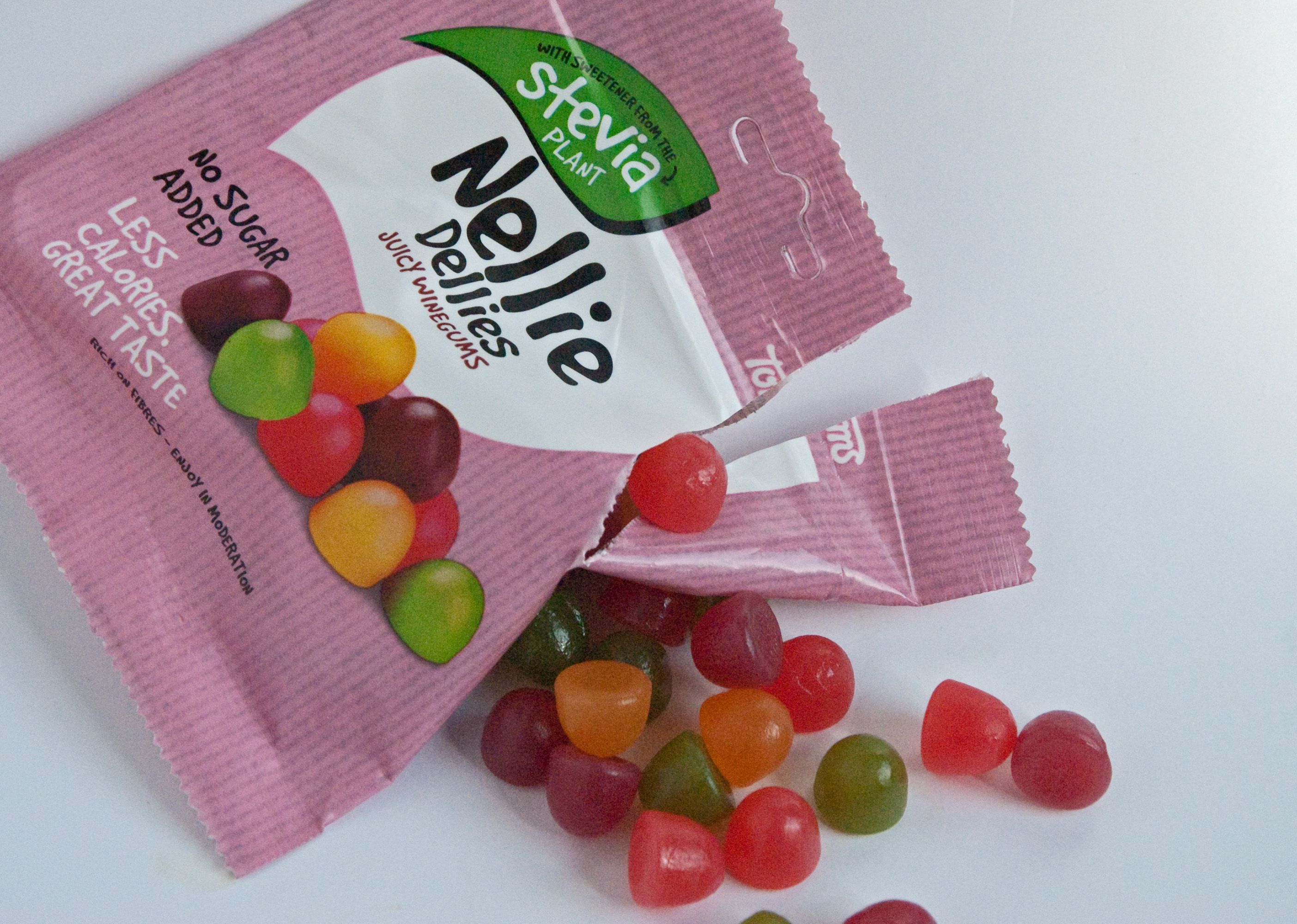
Stevia-sweetened wine gums produced by Toms (June 2016)

- Anthon Berg – a corporate division within Toms International, the company produced a diverse variety of chocolate products. The title "Purveyors to the Royal Danish Court" was awarded to Anthon Berg in 1957.
- Bogø Chokolade
- Holly Bar
- Nellie Dellies
- Toms
- Pingvin
- Yankie Bar – a popular chocolate bar in Denmark composed of caramel, nougat, and milk chocolate

=== Galle & Jessen ===
- Ga-Jol
- Galle & Jessen
