= Kronprinsensgade =

Street in Copenhagen, Denmark

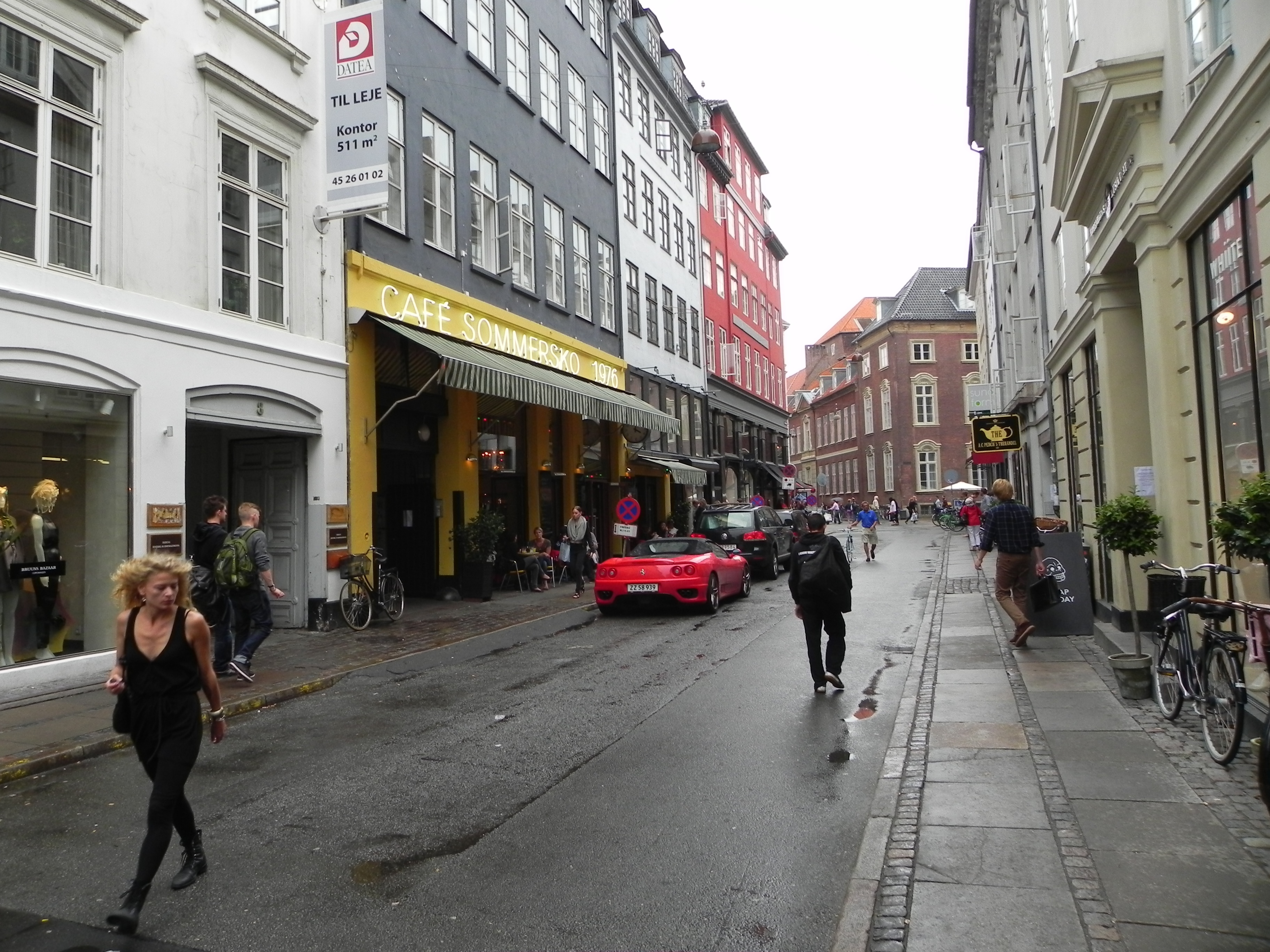
- Length: 110 m (360 ft)
- Location: Copenhagen, Denmark
- Quarter: Indre By
- Postal code: 1114
- Coordinates: 55°40′50.52″N 12°34′45.48″E
- West end: Købmagergade
- East end: Pilestræde

Kronprinsensgade (lit. "The Crown Prince's Street") is a street in the Old Town of Copenhagen, Denmark. It links the major shopping street Købmagergade in the west with Pilestræde in the east. The street is known for A.C. Perch's Rea Store.

== History ==
Kronprinsensgade is one of the younger streets in the Old Town of Copenhagen. The city's first mail house, Postgården, was built at the site from where the street now extends from Købmagergade in 1727 but it was destroyed just one year later in the Copenhagen Fire of 1728.

In 1783, Kronprinsensgade was established at the private initiative of master timber Johan Peter Boye Junge (1735–1807) after he had acquired a large site between Købmagergade and Pilestræde earlier that same year. The street was named for the later king Frederick VI. The street was built over in the 1780s and 1790s.

== Notable buildings and residents ==
Johan Peter Boye Junge who created the street was also responsible for the construction of No. 2 (1785), No. 4–6 (1785–1791), No. 11 (1885) and the building at the corner with Pilestræde (Kronprinsensgade 13 / Pilestræde 37) of which the latter is listed. The buildings at No. 14 and No. 16 (Kronprinsensgade 16 / Pilestræde 35a-f ) were both built by Andreas Hallander.

The A.C. Perch's Thehandel tea shop at No. 5 is one of the oldest shops in Copenhagen. The building from 1805, with Ionic order pilasters flanking the three central bays on the first and second floor, is listed. A. C. Perchs Tehandel opened at the site in 1835. In 2006, Perch's Tea Room opened on the first floor. The neighbouring building at No. 7 was built for the United Masonic Lodges (De forenede Frimurerloger( to design by the architect Peter Friis. The building was inaugurated on 7 January 1807 and was used by the Freemasons until they moved to their new headquarters on Klerkegade (No. 2) in 1868. The building was then acquired by Håndværkerforeningen. They had a 2000-volume library reading room and billiard room in the building but moved out after taking over Moltke's Mansion on Dronningens Tværgade in 1930.

== Image gallery ==
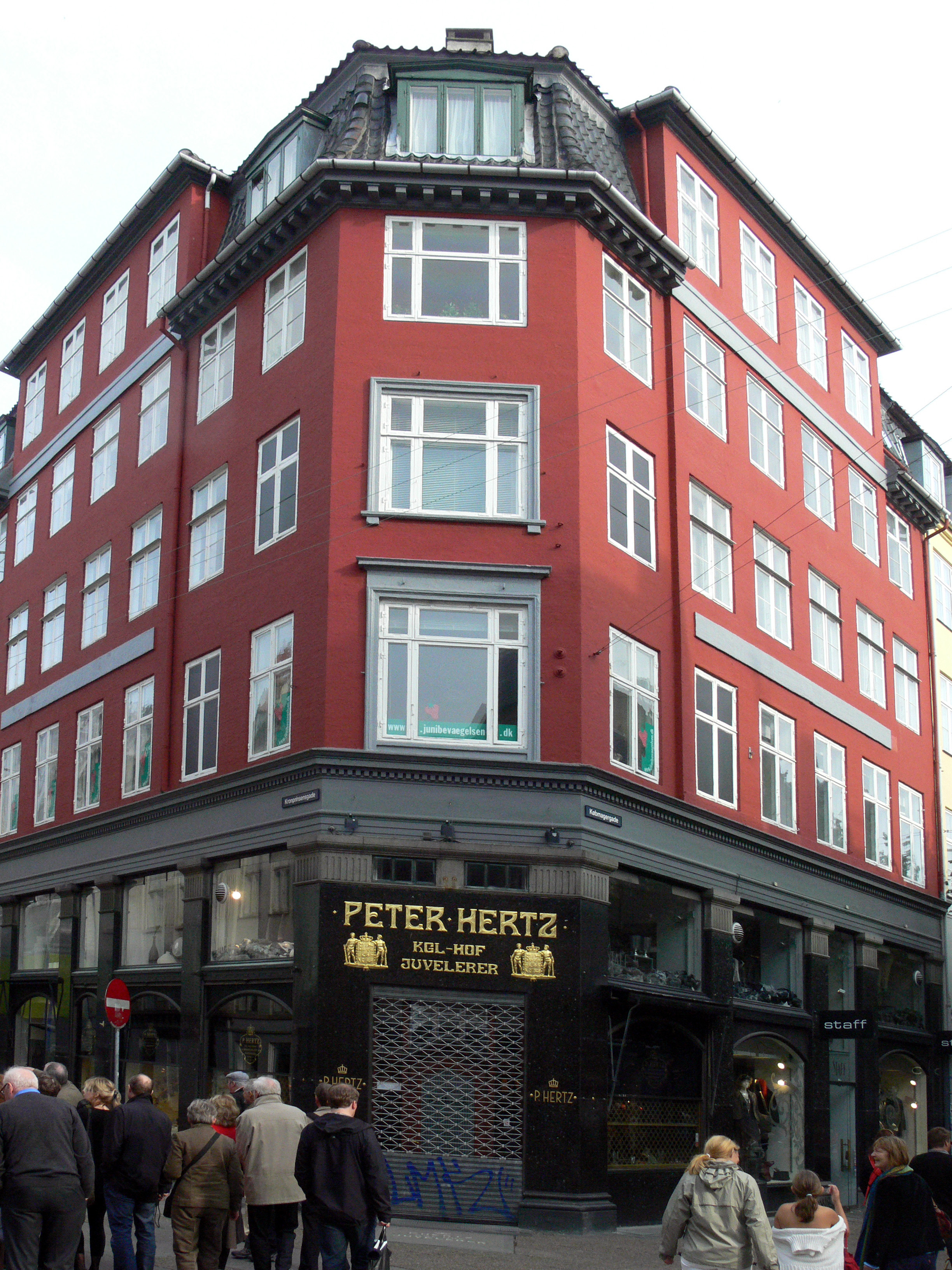
No. 2: Corner with Købmagergade

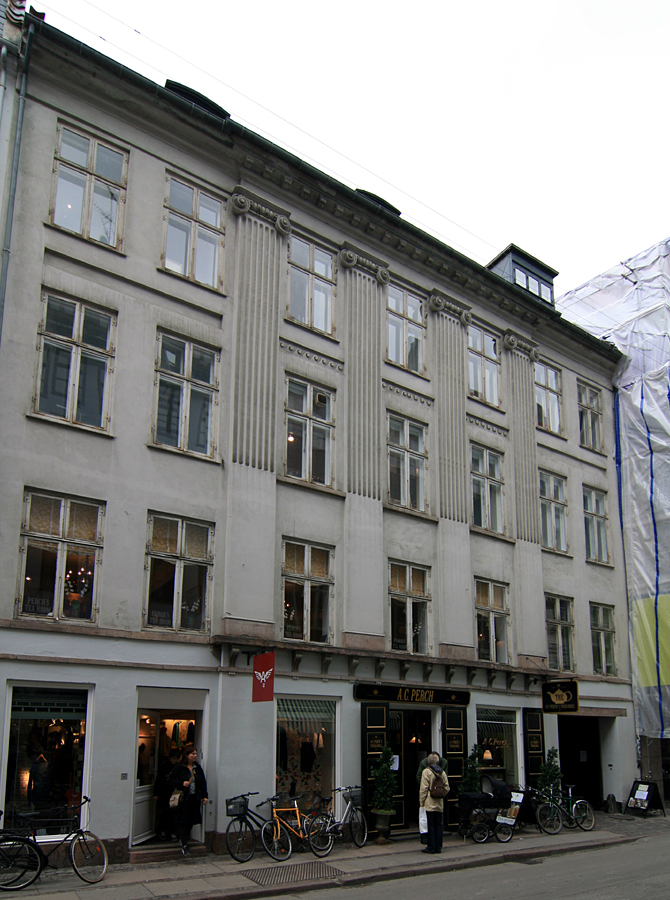
No. 5 with the Perch Tea Store

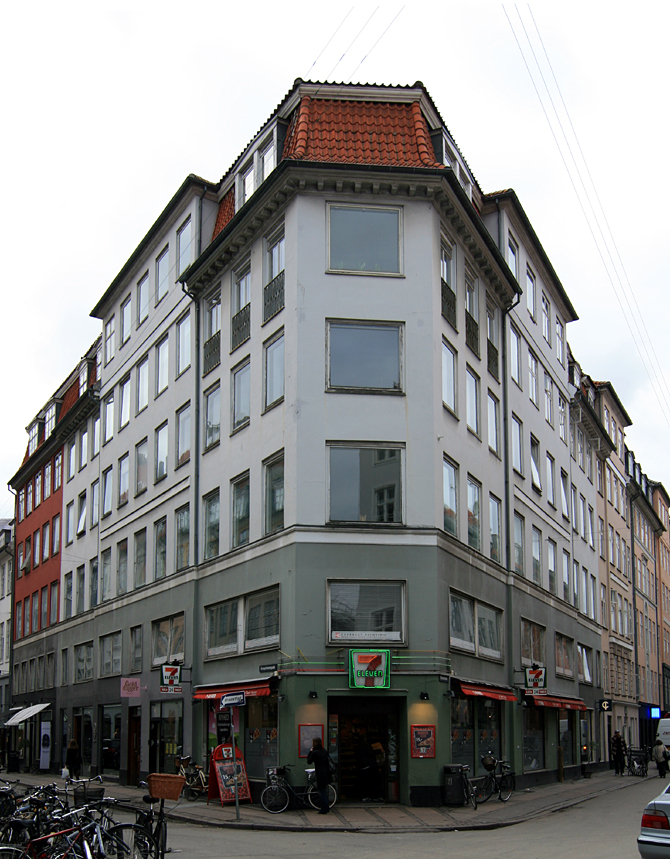
No. 13, corner with Pilestræde

== See also ==
- Julius Hoffensberg
