= A.C. Perch's Thehandel =

Tea shop in Copenhagen, Denmark

Coordinates: 55.6806°N 12.5789°E

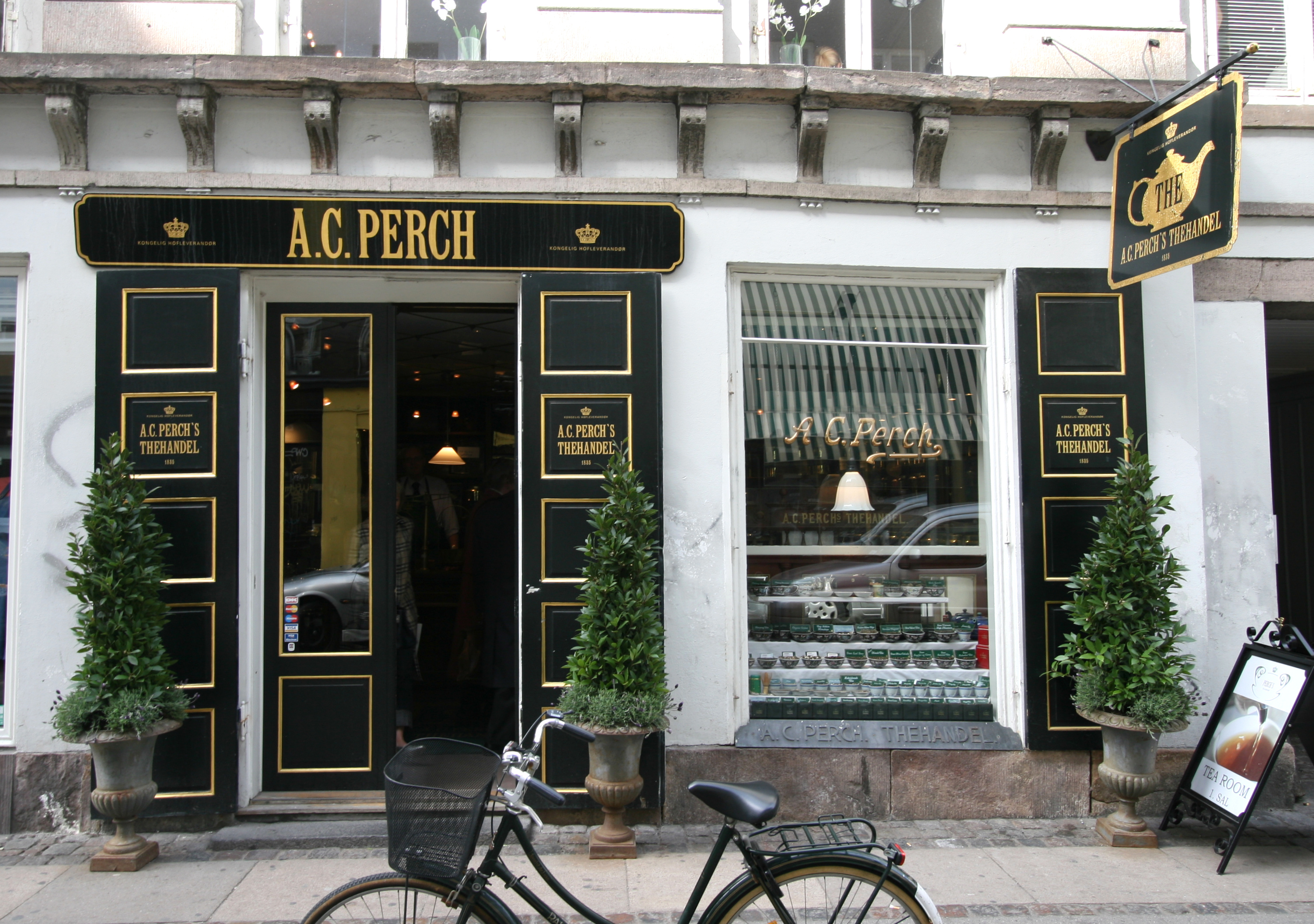
- Facade at Kronprinsensgade 5, Copenhagen
- Native name: A.C. Perch's Thehandel
- Industry: Tea retail
- Founded: April 1835; 191 years ago
- Founder: Niels Brock Perch
- Headquarters: Copenhagen, Denmark
- Products: Tea
- Website: perchs.dk

A.C. Perch's Thehandel is a tea shop opened in 1835 by Niels Brock Perch at Kronprinsensgade 5 in Copenhagen, Denmark. It opened an English-style tearoom on the first floor in 2005. The company has also opened tea houses in Aarhus and Oslo and operates a web shop. The company is a Purveyor to the Court of Denmark.

== History ==
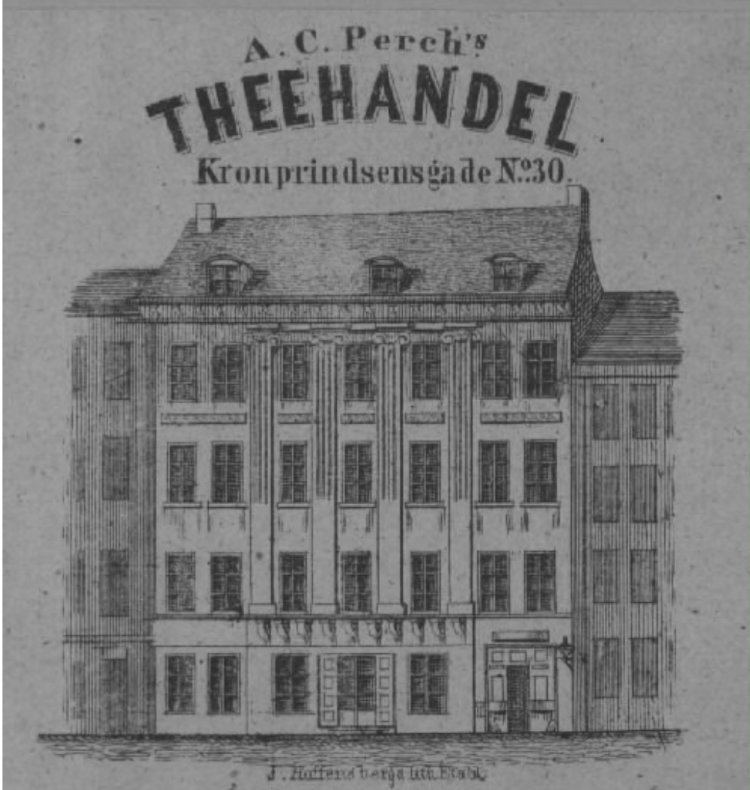
Advertisement for A.C. Perch's Tea Shop

The company traces its history back to the late 18th century when Niels Bay Perch, with support from his friend Niels Brock, established a grocer's in Christianshavn. His son, who was given the name Niels Brock Perch after the friend, founded the tea house. His first shop was based in the Exchange Building at Slotsholmen. In April 1835, he opened a shop in Kronprinsensgade. The shop was named after his third eldest son, Alex Christian Perch, who ran it until his death on 31 March 1882. The shop was then taken over by his loyal employee Frantz Christoffer Kruse. He sold it to Adolph Rosaurus Hansen. After his death in 1927, it was taken over by his relative Ludvig Hincheldey and the two employees Marie Poulsen and Emilie Nielsen.

An English-style tearoom, Perch's Tea Room, opened above the shop in Kronprinsensgade in 2006. On 11 November 2006, a franchise shop opened in Tokyo. In August 2013, A.C. Perchs Thehandel opened a combined tea shop and tearoom in Aarhus. In November 2014, a Perch's Tea Shop opened in a Sten & Strøm shopping center in Oslo.

== Today ==
The company is owned by Christian Hincheldey and Stine Louise Alwén, fourth generation of the Hincheldey family. The shop in Kronprinsensgade is the eighth oldest shop in Copenhagen. The building is from 1805 and listed. Ionic order pilasters flank the three central bays on the first and second floor.

== See also ==
- A. C. Gamél
