= Toldbodgade 9 =

Listed building in Copenhagen

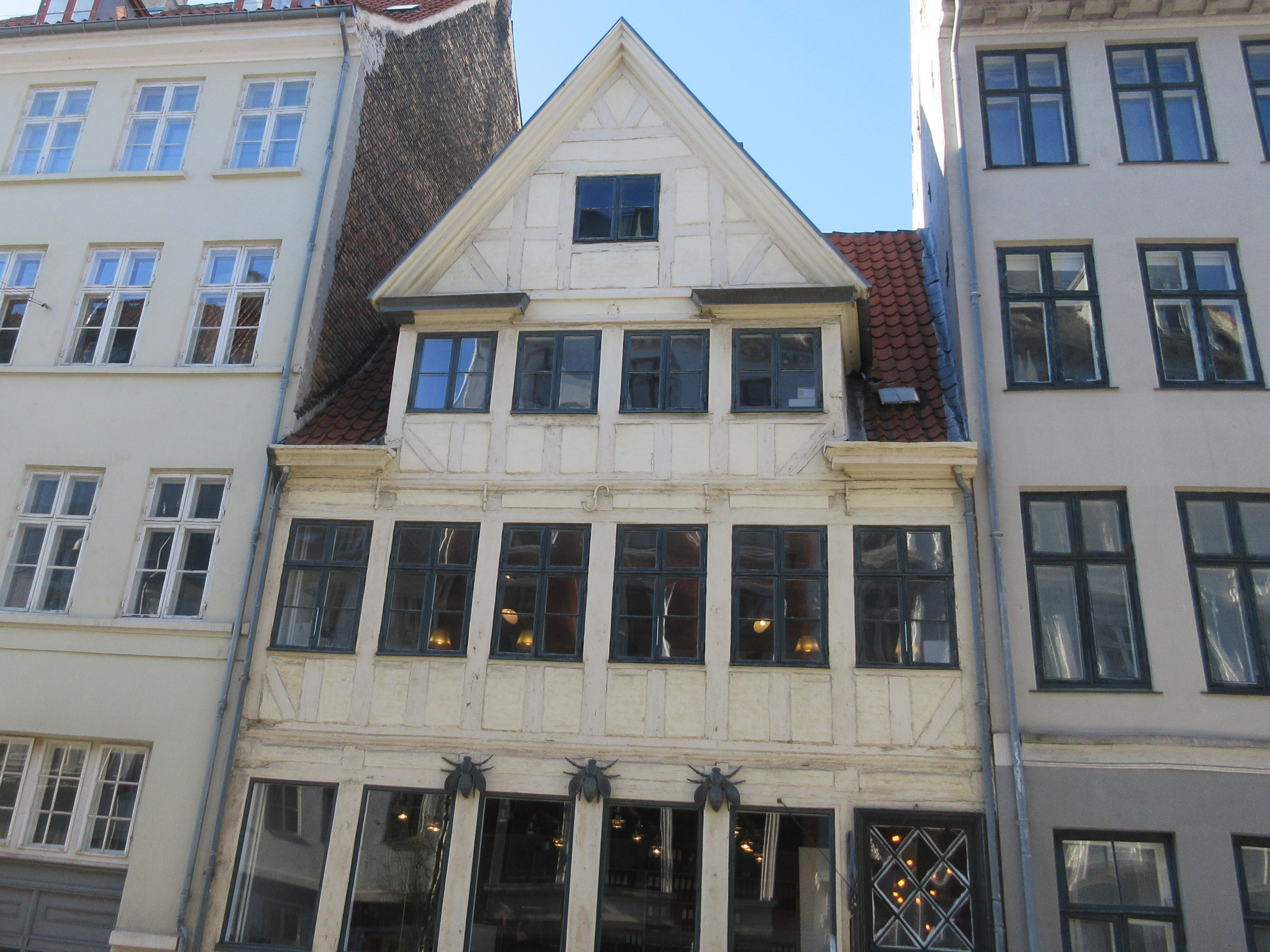
- Interactive map of the Toldbodgade 9 area

General information
- Location: Copenhagen, Denmark
- Coordinates: 55°40′48.83″N 12°35′29.87″E
- Completed: 17th century

Toldbodgade 9 is a half-timbered building situated in the Nyhavn Quarter of central Copenhagen, Denmark. For about 50 years, from the 1800s until his death in 1852, the property belonged to Henning Hansen Rønne, a skipper from Bornholm, who for a period was alderman of the Skipper's Guild in Copenhagen. The building was later for a while operated as a hotel under the name Hotel Helsingborg. The building was listed in the Danish registry of protected buildings and places in 1918. In 1953, the building was bought by art dealer Viggo Clausen, who subsequently converted it into an art gallery under the name Claussens Kunsthandel. In 2018, Claussens Kunsthandel relocated to new premises at Studiestræde 14. A restaurant administration is now located in the building.

== History ==
=== Early history ===
The site was originally part of a much larger property. This large property was listed in Copenhagen's first cadastre from 1689 as No. 27 in St. Ann's East Quarter. It belonged to admiral Marcus Rodsten at that time. The present building on the site was probably already constructed in the 17th century and definitely not later than 1732.

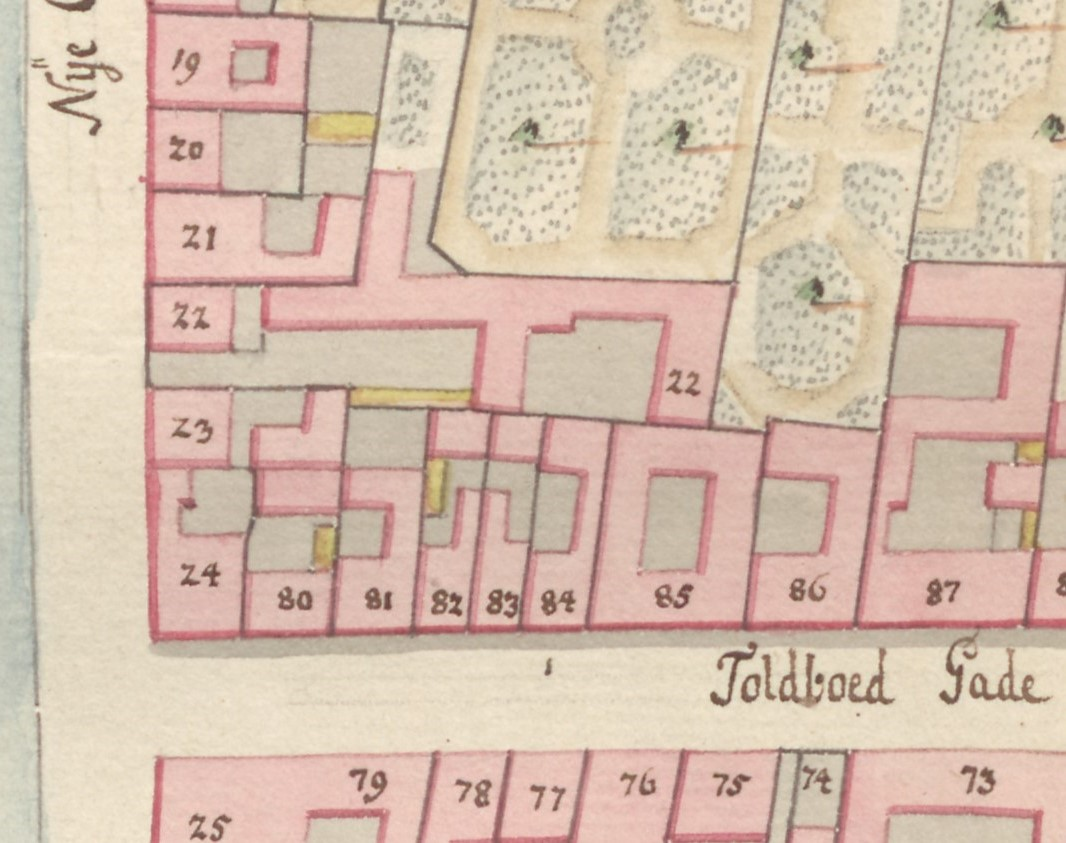
No. 84 seen in a detail from Christian Gedde's map of St. Ann's East Quarter, 1757

The property was later divided into smaller properties. The property now known as Toldbodgade 59 was listed in the new cadastre of 1756 as No. 84 in St. Ann's East Quarter. It belonged to timber merchant Hans Larsen at that time.

The property was home to 13 residents in four households at the 1787 census. Madame Anna Larsen, Hans Larsen's widow, who now owned the property, resided in the building with a maid. Jens Flensborg, a ship carpenter, resided in the building with his wife Karen Knuds Datter. Peder Krag, a former beer seller (øltapper), resided in the building with his wife Maria Molmann. Anders Jørgensen, a firewood handler (favnsætter, a person employed by the Magistrate to measure firewood), resided in the building with his wife Anna Niels Datter, their four children (aged one to eight) and his mother-in-law Kirsten Jens Datter.

The property was home to seven residents in two households at the 1801 census. Edvard Winsen, a restaurateur, resided in the building with his wife Anne Cathrine Elisabeth Andrup, 17-year-old Christiane Marie Andrup and one maid. Anders Falkenberg, a coppersmith, resided in the building with his wife Anne Dorothea Jensdatter and their 12-year-old daughter Pauline Christine [Falkenberg].

=== Henning and Anne Rønne ===
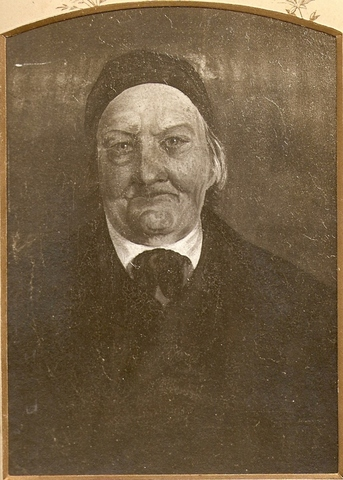
Henning Hansen Rønne

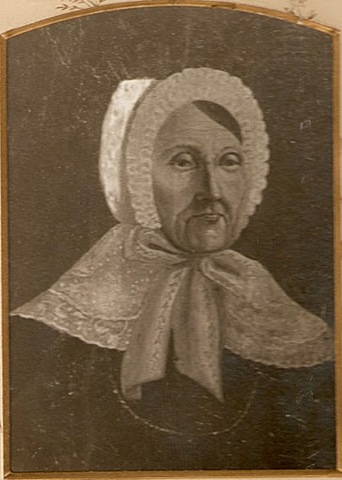
Anne Kirstine Rønne

The property was later acquired by skipper Henning Hansen Rønne (1766-1852). His property was listed in the new cadastre of 1806 as No. 52 in St. Ann's East Quarter. Rønne was originally from Bornholm. He and his two brothers, Jens and Hans, had assumed the last name Rønne after their hometown of Rønne. From 1831 to 1844, Rønne served as alderman of the Skippers Guild in Copenhagen.

Henning Hansen Rønne was married to Ane Christine Bang (1765-1843). Together they were the parents of at least three sons and two daughters. Anne Kirstine Rønne (née Bang) also had a daughter from her first marriage, Cathrine Marie Brandt (1787-1855), who was married to her husband's younger brother, Hans Hansen Rønne (1780-1859), another ship captain, with whom she lived two houses away at Toldbodgade 5 (first floor). Henning and Anne Kirstine Rønne's daughter (1796-1867), widow of Henrik Jensen Hammer (1779-1828), resided on the ground floor of the same building (Toldbodgade 5) in 1834.

Ane Christine Bang's brother Stie Thomsen Bangoperated a sailmaker's workshop around the corner at Nyhavn 41. Henning and Ane Christine Rønne's eldest son Thomas (1800-1871) was trained as a sailmaker in the uncle's workshop. He lived with the uncle at Nyhavn 41 (second floor) at the 1834 census.

Henning Hansen Rønne's property was home to 29 residents in five households at the 1834 census. He and his wife resided on the first floor with their second eldest son Andreas Christian Rønne (aged 28, ship captain), their third-eldest son Gerhardt Peter Rønne (aged 23, joiner) and one maid. Rønne's sister Hansine Chirstine Ludvigsen (née Rønne), a retailer of colonial goods, resided on the ground floor with her four children (aged four to 11), her sister Gertrud Marie Rønne and one maid. Christian Pettersen, a shopkeeper, resided in the building with his wife Christine Marie Lind, their three children (aged five to 10), a maid and a lodger. Hans Olsen, a barkeeper, resided in the basement with his wife Sine Kierby, two daughters (aged six and 20) and two lodgers (workmen). Niels Christian Thomsen, a watchman at nearby Larsens Plads, resided on the second floor of the rear wing with his wife Christine Johanne Bergitte Bonie and their two daughters (aged 14 and 15).

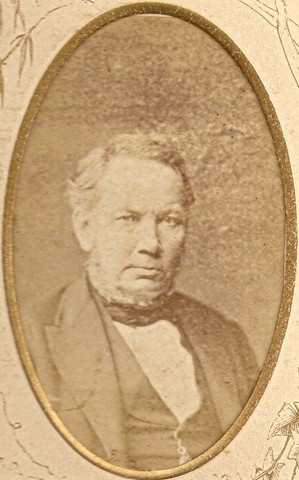
Gerhardt Peter Rønne

Tønne's property was home to 17 residents at the 1840 census. Henning and Ana Kierstine Rønne resided on the first floor with a maid. Hansine Kierstine Ludvigsen (née Rønne) still resided on the ground floor with her four children and one maid. Gerhardt Peter Rønne, who had now become a master joiner, resided on the second floor with two apprentices (aged 14 and 20). Jens Christian Moulstrup, a sailmaker, resided in the basement with his wife Christina Marie Moulstrup (née Andresen), their two children (aged three and five) and his mother-in-law Ane Christina Andresen.

Anne Kirstine Rønne died on 6 November 1743. Henning Hansen Rønne's property was home to 14 residents at the 1845 census. The owner resided on the first floor with a maid. Hansine Kierstine Ludvigsen resided on the ground floor with her four children and one maid. Christian Borch, a cooper, resided in the basement with his wife Marie Borch, their three children (aged two to eight) and one lodger (cooper).

TRønne's property was home to 22 residents in six households at the 1850 census. Henning Hansen Rønne resided on the first floor with his daughter Maria Thomasen Hammer (née Rønne, who lived at Toldbodgade 5 in 1834) and one maid. Sidsel Margrethe Kofoed (née Møller, 1777–1853), widow of, widow of a sailing master (styrmand) Thomas From Kofod (1779-1746), resided on the same floor with her daughter Catrine Emilie Birch (mée Kofod, 1713–1753; widow of ship captain Peter Kofoed Birch, 1808–1848), two widows, resided on the same floor with the building painter Johan Anton August Jacobsen. C. Borch, a craftsman, resided on the second floor with his wife Marie Borch and their four children (aged two to 13). H. Borch, a tobacco spinner, resided on the same floor with two daughters. Hansine Kirstine Ludvigsen (née Rønne) resided on the ground floor with three unmarried daughters and one maid. Rasmus Mortensen, a shopkeeper, resided in the basemebnt with his wife Anna Magrede Andreasen.

=== 1860 census ===
The property was home to six households at the 1850 census. Hansine Ludvigsen still resided in the building with her daughter Ana Charlotte Ludvigsen. Bolette Maria Olsen, a widow, resided in the building with two sons (aged 30 and 35), a lodger and a maid. Nils Peter Nilsen, a ship carpenter and quartermaster, resided in the building with his wife Hedevig Caroline Nilsen and their two children (aged seven and 11). Frederik Ferdinant Jensen, a barkeeper, resided in the building with his wife Johanne Jensen, their five children (aged one to eight), a maid and a lodger. Christen Hansen, a workman, resided in the building with his wife Maria Hansen and their two children (aged one and six).

=== 20th century ===
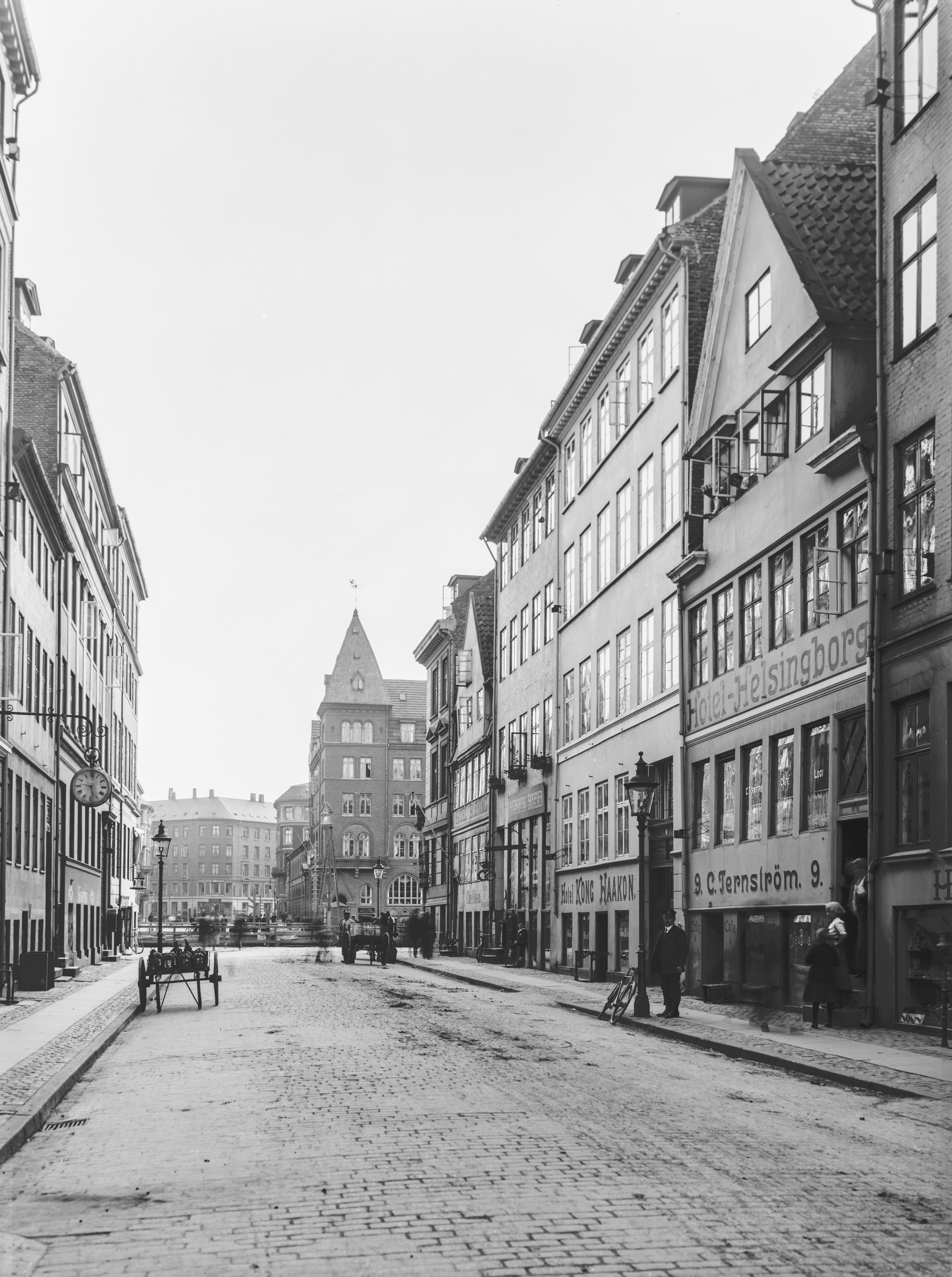
The building in 1911

In the 1900s the building was operated as a hotel under the name Hotel Helsingobrg. The proprietor of the hotel was Carl Olaf Ternstrøm.

The building was listed in the Danish registry of protected buildings and places in 1918.

In 1953, the building was bought by art dealer Viggo Clausen, who subsequently converted it into an art gallery under the name Claussens Kunsthandel. The gallery hosted Helle Thorborg's first solo exhibition in 1954. Other artists who were associated the gallery included Poul Ekelund, Seppo Mattinen, Reidar Magnus, Albert Mertz, Henry Heerup, Palle Nielsen and Svend Wiig Hansen. In 1985, Claussen was awarded the N. L. Høyen Medal for his contribution to the Danish art scene. As of 2009, Toldbodgade 9 belonged to Karen Hessellund Jacobi. After Viggo Claussen's death, the gallery was continued by his daughter Lis Claussen. It hosted its last exhibition in 2017. In 2018, it reopened at Studiestræde 14.

== Architecture ==
Toldbodgade 9 is a five-bay-wide, half-timbered building constructed with two storeys over a walk-out basement. The facade is crowned by a three-bay gabled wall dormer. A slightly taller, narrow side wing extends from the rear side of the building. It is attached to a rear wing of the same proportions as the front wing.

== Today ==
Brooklyn, a restaurant and bar operated by the Streckers restaurant, is now based in the building. The restaurant specializes in smørrebrød.
