= Lille Kongensgade =

Street in Copenhagen, Denmark

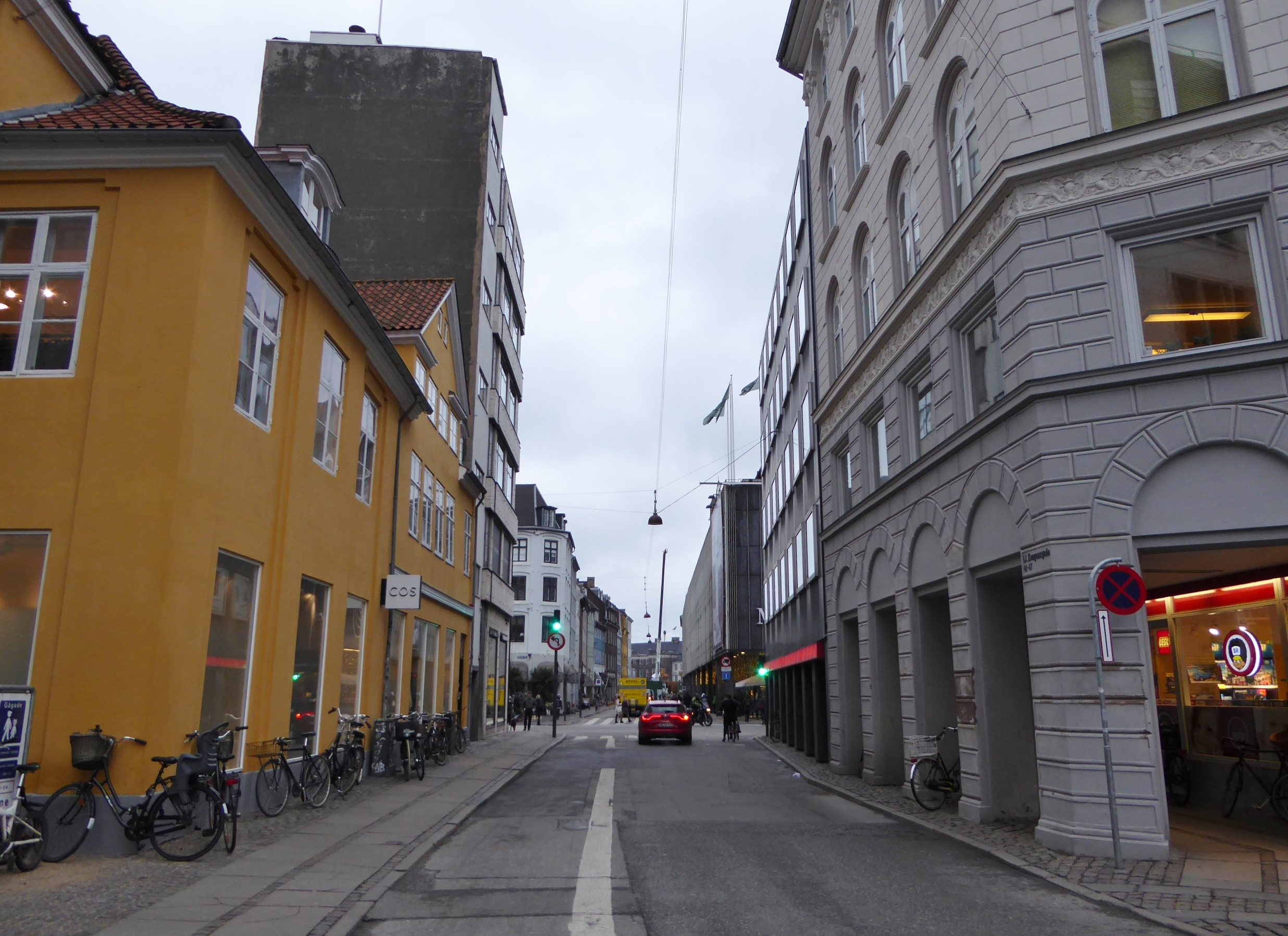
- Interactive map of Lille Kongensgade
- Length: 212 m (696 ft)
- Location: Copenhagen, Denmark
- Quarter: City centre
- Nearest metro station: Kongens Nytorv
- Coordinates: 55°40′46″N 12°35′0″E
- East end: Kongens Nytorv
- West end: Nikolaj Plads

Lille Kongensgade (lit. "King's Little Street) is a back street located south of and roughly parallel with the Østergade section of Strøget in central Copenhagen, Denmark, linking Kongens Nytorv in the east with Nikolaj Plads in the west. The entire south side of the first part of the street (to Bremerholm) is occupied by the Magasin du Nord department store.

== History ==
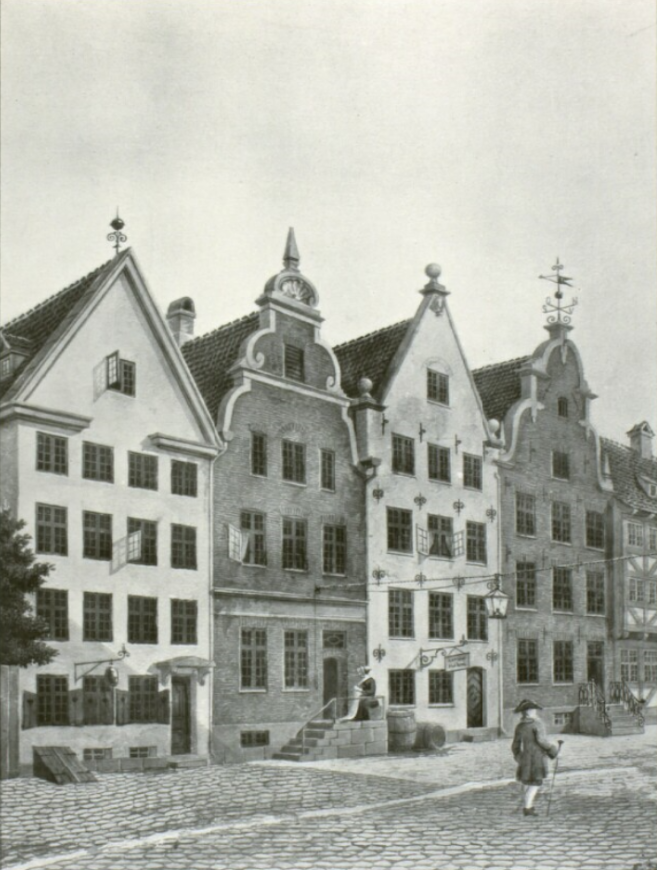
Narrow houses on the south side of the street

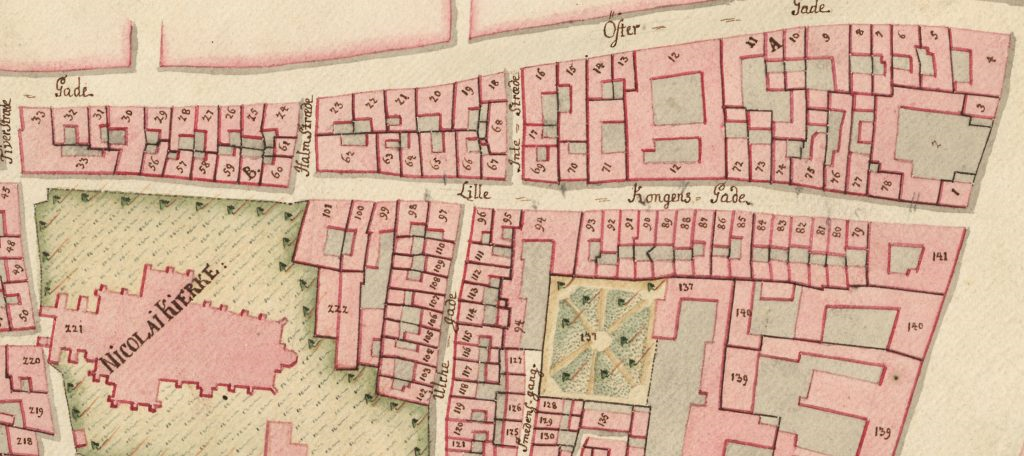
Lille Kongensgade seen on Gedde's district map

The street was created in the 16th century when the king redeveloped a portion of the garden of King John's Wine House in Vingårdsstræde. A row of narrow houses were constructed along the south side of the new street and let out to civil servants and lower-ranking court employees such as skippers and carpenters. It was known as the "King's Long Row" (Danish: Kongens Lange Boder). The street was initially simply called Kongensgade (King's Street) but received its current name when Ny Kongensgade was renamed Store Kongensgade (King's Great Street) to prevent confusion between the two streets. It is unclear exactly when the name change occurred.

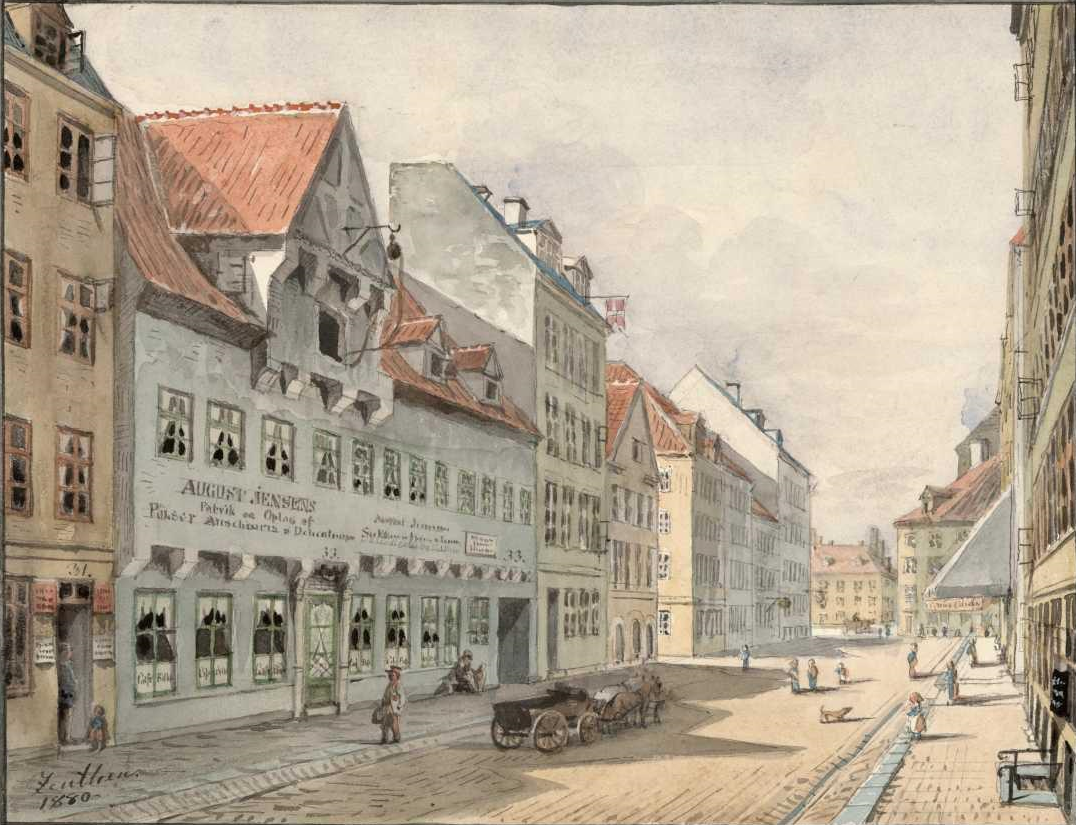
The street painted by Christian Olavius Zeuthen

The Skippers' Guild House was from 1665 located in the street (No. 33). The building was a half-timbered Rrnaissance-style building from 1606 with a large system of courtyards and rear wings . The Skippers' Guild sold the building in 1804 and relocated to the corner of Bremerholm and Holmens Kanal. The building in Lille Kongensgade was demolished in 1881/82.

Many of the buildings on the north side of the street were rear wings associated with properties on the more prominent main street Østergade. An example was A. C. Gamél's property at Østergade 27 (then 20) and Lille Kongensgade 33. It operated the first coffee roastery in Copenhagen in the courtyard. Brødrene Andersen, a manufacturer of gentlemen's clothing, was located at No. Østergade 7-9/Lille Kongensgade 8-10 from 1916.

Magasin du Nord purchased and demolished the houses at No. 3–11 in around 1910 to pave the way for an extension of the department store which was inaugurated in 1914. The rest of the houses on section between Kongens Nytorv and present-day Bremerholm were acquired in 1911. The four buildings at No. 23-29 were replaced by a low, one-storey extension. The small square Magasins Torv was created around the same time and this gave Magasin du Nord a second entrance which was visible from Strøget. The one-storey extension was heightened in 1959 and again in 1964.

== Notable buildings ==
The buildings at No. 4, 6, 16 and 34 are listed on the Danish registry of protected buildings and places.

No. 6 is from 1767 and houses the restaurant Skindbuksen. The building is nine bays wide and is crowned by a three-bay dormer.

The four-bay townhouse at No. 6 was built over three storeys for metalsmith Ulrich Grab in 1675 and later heightened with one storey in 1770.

The sixbay building at No. 16 is from 1877 to 1878 and replaced the smaller rear wing of the much older Karel van Mander House on Østergade.

The low building at No. 34 was built for wine merchant Hendrich Nissen in 1728.

== Transport ==
Kongens Nytorv Station is located at the beginning of the street.
