= Nyhavn 41 =

Building in Copenhagen, Denmark

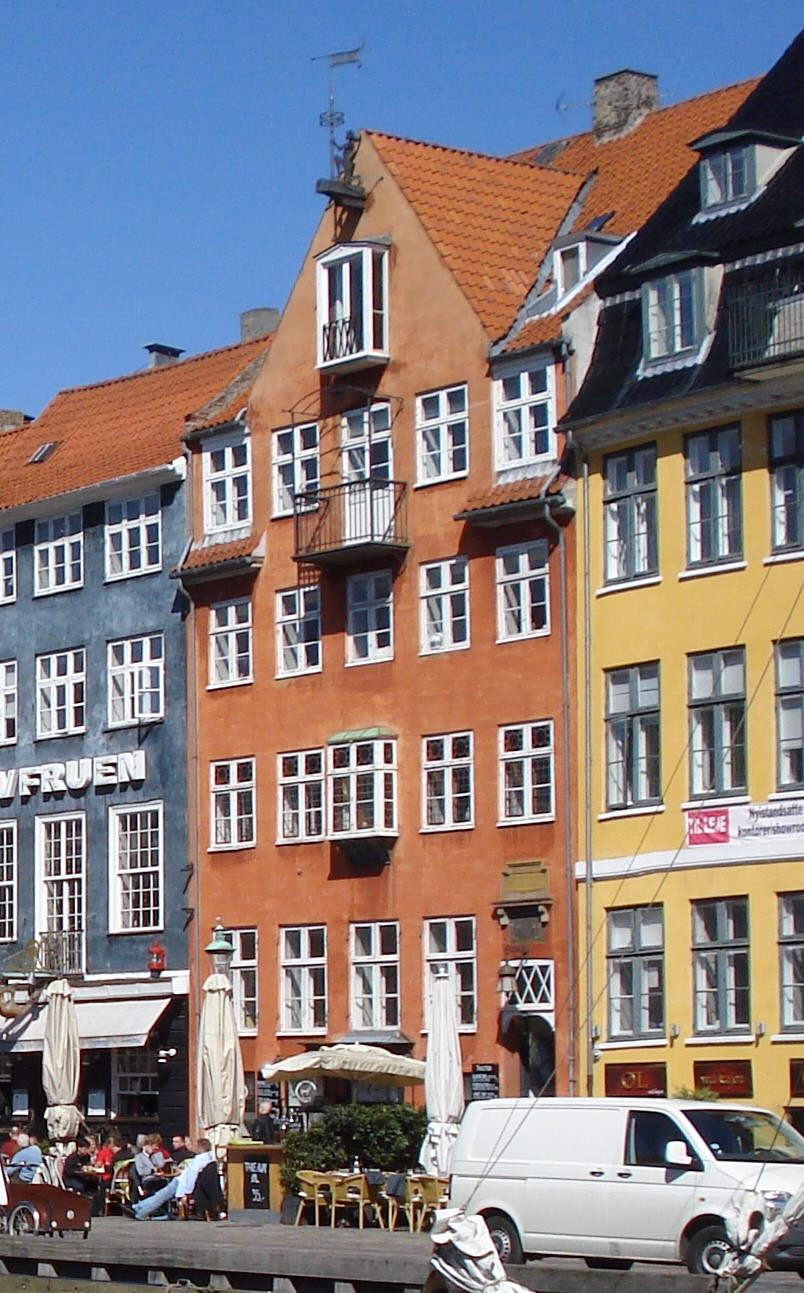
- Nyhavn 33 seen from the other side of the canal
- Interactive map of the Nyhavn 41 area

General information
- Location: Copenhagen, Denmark, Denmark
- Coordinates: 55°40′48.26″N 12°35′26.89″E
- Completed: 1698

Nyhavn 41 is a listed property overlooking the Nyhavn canal in central Copenhagen, Denmark. For most of the 19th century, the property was owned by a family of sailmakers. The manufacturing of flags and compasses was also part of their trade. The building was listed in the Danish registry of protected buildings and places in 1918.

== History ==
=== 18th century ===
The site was formerly part of a much larger property, comprising all the properties now known as Nyhavn 41–49. This large property was listed in Copenhagen's first cadastre of 1689 as No. 28 in St. Ann's East Quarter. It was owned by tanner Villum Lydersen at that time. It was later divided into a number of smaller properties. The present building on the site was constructed between 1698 and 1699 for Hans Bentsen. Originally a two-storey building, it was heightened with one storey some time between 1731 and 1753.

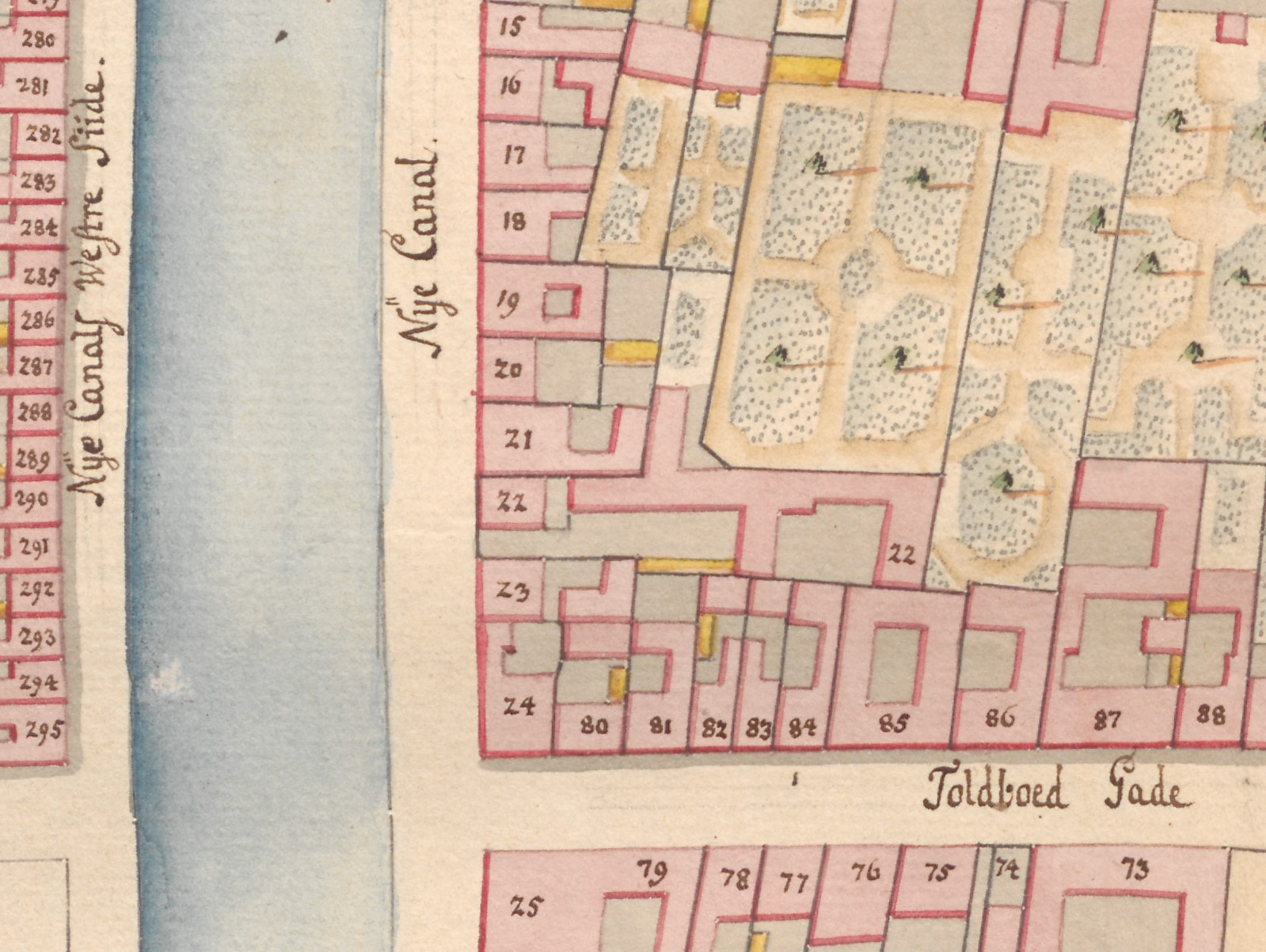
No. 21 seen in a detail from Christian Gedde's map of St. Ann's East Quarter, 1757

The property was listed in the new cadastre of 1756 as No. 21 in St. Ann's East Quarter. It was owned by Nikolaj Hansen Juul at that time.

The property was later owned by sailmaker Hans Kleitrup. His daughter Anne Kirstine Hansdatter Kleitrup (1721–1788) was married to sailmaker Ole Pedersen Sangaard at No. 24 (now Nyhavn 45).

No. 21 was home to four households at the 1787 census. Michael Mogensen Black, a merchant, resided in the building with his wife Anna Elisabeth, an employee and a maid. Christian Baden, a timber merchant, resided in the building with his wife Margaretha, the wife's nephew Christian Hemskov and a maid. The third household consisted of Hans Kleitrup, his wife Anne Lyngbye, three children from his first marriage (aged 10 to 16), six apprentices (aged 17 to 24) and a maid. The fourth household consisted of Anders Christensen and his wife Giertrud Simons Datter.

=== Bang and Rønne families ===
At the time of the 1801 census, No. 21 was home to two households. Georg Rømer, a 40-year-old merchant, resided in the building with his wife Sophie Caroline Lanek, their six children (aged four to 17), two employees, a maid and a lodger. Cornelia Pass, the widow of a captain named Bagger, resided in the building with her daughter Eva Cornelia Bagger as well as the 40-year-old manufacturer of sails and compasses Stie Thomsen Bang, Bang's 70-year-old father Thomas S. Bang, four sail-maker's apprentices and a maid.

In the new cadastre of 1806, the property was again listed as No. 21. It was by then owned by H. G. Rømer & T. Stolpe.

Stie Thomsen Bang's workshop was located in a rear wing. Stolpe was most likely his business partner (cf. the 1834 census). Bang was later also joined by his nephew Thomas Rønne. The nephew was the son of skipper Henning Hansen Rønne and Ane Kristine Rønne (née Bang), who lived around the corner at Toldbodgade 9.

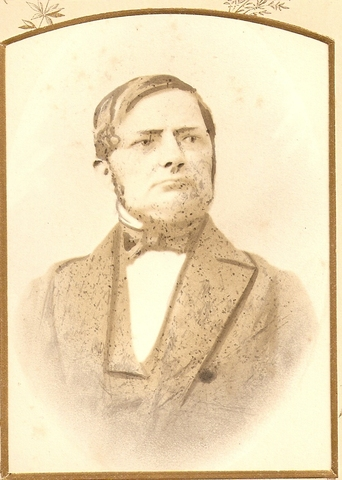
Thomas Rønne (1800–1874)

At the time of the 1834 census, No. 21 was home to four households. Stie Bang (aged 73), Tomas Rønne (aged 34) and Carel Stolpe (aged 66)—three master sailmakers—occupied the second floor. They lived there with Rønne's wife and three-year-old son, five apprentices and two maids. Carl Jacobsen Leth, a skipper, resided on the first floor with his wife Neel Leth and one maid. Hans Nissen, a ship captain (sjobsfører), resided on the ground floor with his wife Friederickke Petersen, their four children (aged seven to 24), a maid and a lodger (a surgeon). Bolette Jensen, a 54-year-old widow beer seller (øltapper), resided in the basement with her 15-year-old son, a maid and a lodger.

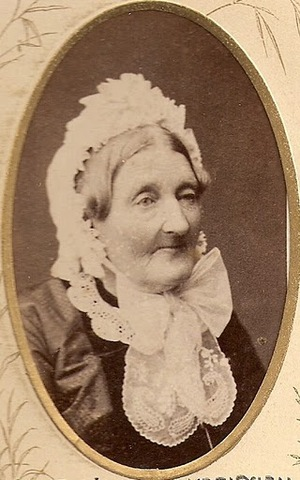
Anne Kirstine Rønne (1807–1894)

At the time of the 1840 census, No. 21 was home to 32 people. Andreas Martin Brandt, a merchant, was the new tenant of the first floor apartment. He lived there with his wife Helene Brandt, their two children (aged 13 and 15), 22-year-old Louise Augusta Kroghmeyer (from Als) and one maid.

The property was home to 31 residents at the 1880 census. Stie Christian Rønne (1831–1922), a sailmaker, resided on the second floor with his wife Ane Kirstine Rønne (1847–1922), his mother Ane Kirstine Rønne, his brother Rasmus Bang Rønne and two maids. Henning Hansen Rønne, an office clerk, resided on the first floor with his wife Hanssine Maire Rønne, their two children (aged zero and four), his wife's sister Cathrine Marie Rønne and one maid. Bendt Lassen, a workman, resided on the ground floor with his wife Ana Lassen. Vilhelm Heinrich Wulff, a barkeeper, resided in the basement with his wife Sass Wulff, their four children (aged two to 12), two sons from his first marriage (sailor and clerk, aged 14 and 16). Magrethe Kirstine Terkelsen, a laundry woman, resided on the ground floor of the rear wing with her three children (aged 15 to 22) and one lodger (a smith). Anders Peter Andersen, an office courier, resided on the first floor of the rear wing with his wife Henriette Antoinette Andersen.

The basement was for many years operated as a hotel under the name Hotel King Edward.

=== 20th century ===
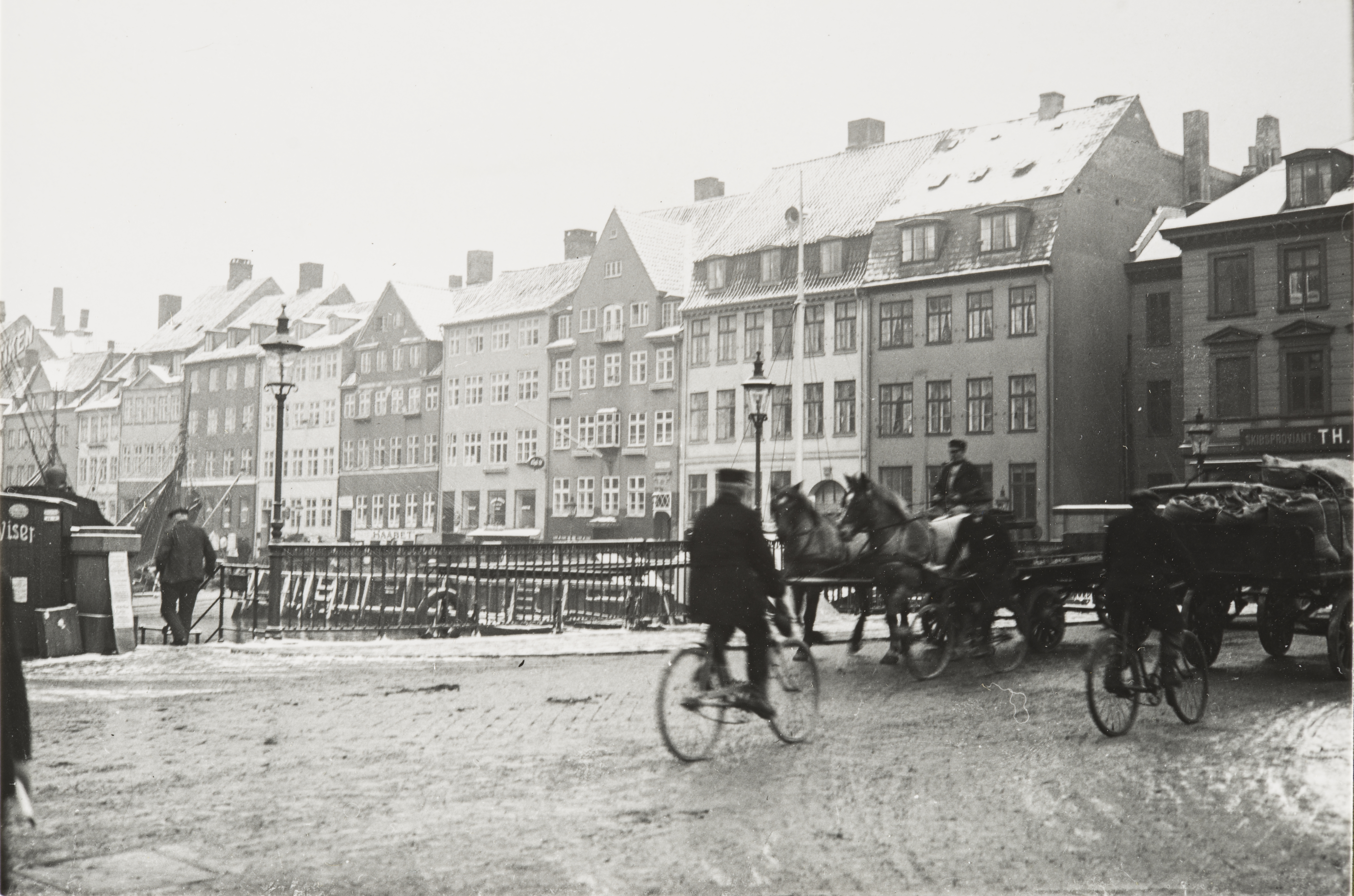
Nyhavn 41, seen from the Nyhavn Bridge on a photograph by Paul Gustav Fischer, c. 1900

In the middle of the 20th century, Simmelhag & Holm was based in the building. The firm was a wholesaler of products from Iceland, Greenland and the Faroe Islands. The company was founded by Andreas Simmelhag in 1834 and, after his death in 1860, taken over by his son F. C. Simmelhag (1843–1906) and C. F. Holm. Andreas Wilian Simmelhag, the founder's grandson, became a partner in 1891. The company was still located in the building in 1950.

== Building ==
The building is three storeys tall, five bays wide and has a three-bay gabled wall dormer. A gable stone has a relief of a compass. It was installed in 1761.

== Today ==
Restaurant "Nyhavn 41" is now based on the ground floor.
