= Studiestræde 14 =

Building in Copenhagen, Denmark

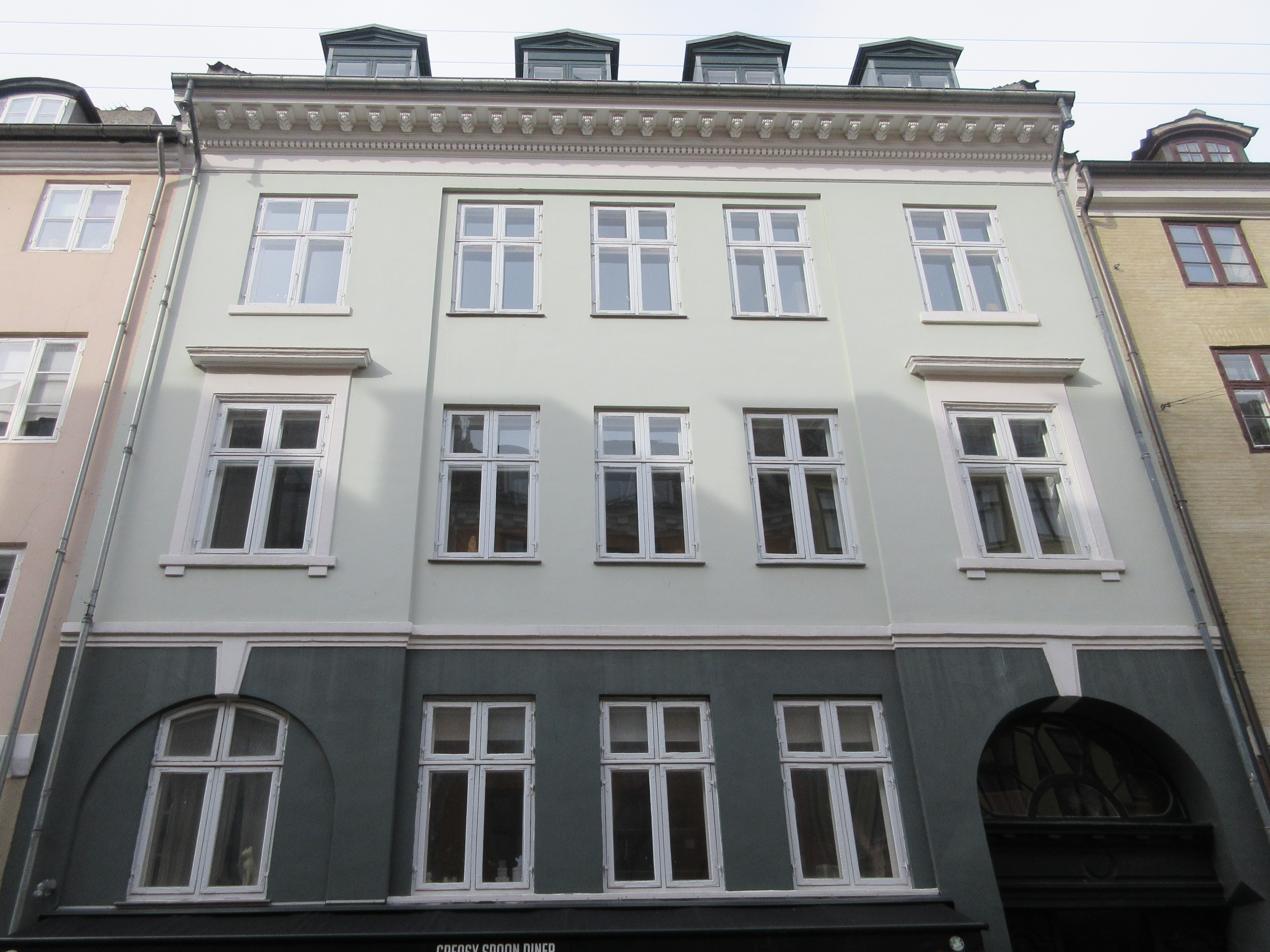
- Interactive map of the Studiestræde 14 area

General information
- Location: Copenhagen, Denmark
- Coordinates: 55°40′43.72″N 12°34′13.12″E
- Completed: 1802

Studiestræde 14 is a Neoclassical property in the Latin Quarter of Copenhagen, Denmark. The building was listed in the Danish registry of protected buildings and places in 1964,

== History ==
The building on the site was destroyed in the Copenhagen Fire of 1795. The current building was constructed by master mason Johan Joachim Schlage in 1801-02. Originally from Germany, on 2 June 1797 Schlage had been granted citizenship as a master mason in Copenhagen. He married Sophie Amalie Kurtzhals, Bertel Thorvaldsen's former girlfriend, some time before November 1803. The Schlage family lived in the building. Their tenants were members of the higher middle-class. A grocer's shop was based in the ground floor. Schlage was a second lieutenant in the civil guard and also active in Copenhagen Fire Department. Sophie Amalie Kurtzhals kept the building after her husband's death in 1833. She died at the site in 1850.

N. G. Wolff, Professor of Theology at the University of Copenhagen and pastor at Vartov Church, was among the tenants in 1835. The illustrator P. C. Klæstrup was among the residents in the years around 1853.

A bakery was later opened in the basement. It relocated to No. 13 on the other side of the street in the mid 1880s.

The property was from circa 1880 owned by a plummer named Lønholdt. It remained in the hands of the family for more than 80 years. The city's Carpenters' Guild was based on the first floor in 1900. Numerous smaller businesses were up through the 20th century based in the building.

The property was in the 1960s acquired by Sonja Kirkholm and later passed to her son Leif Kirkholm.Erhvervenes Forlag was based in the building in the 1960s. Lindhardt & Ringhof was founded at the site Otto Lindhardt and Gert Ringhof in 1971.

Studiestræde 14 was in 1992 sold to Jens Fogh Hansen's Ejendomsinteressentselskabet af 12. 12. 1991. Some 10 years later, it was sold to Initus Ejendomme A/S, a property company owned by Klaus Peter Brock via the construction company Kornerup in Glostrup. The company waS also the owner of the street's No. 5-11.

== Arcgitecture ==
The building consists of three storeys over a raised cellar and is five bays wide. The two slightly projecting outer bays are wider than the three central ones. A gateway sits in the left hand side of the building and the window in the ground floor's fifth bay is placed in an arched niche with a Keystone similar to the one above the gateway to create an impression of symmetry.

== See also ==
- Studiestræde 21
- Studiestræde 24
