= Helle Thorborg =

Danish painter and graphic designer (1927–2025)

- Born: 12 April 1927; Gentofte, Denmark
- Died: 13 November 2025 (aged 98)
- Education: Royal Danish Academy of Fine Arts
- Known for: Painting, graphic design, illustration
- Notable work: Decoration of the pulpit, Gimsing Church (1988)
- Movement: Colourism (Koloristerne)
- Spouse: Carl Henry Beckmann
- Children: Gertrud (1956), Laurids Reidar (1957), Marius Ingvar (1959)
- Awards: Tagea Brandt Rejselegat (1981); Eckersberg Medal (1990); Anne Marie Telmányi Prize (1994)

Helle Thorborg (12 April 1927 – 13 November 2025) was a Danish painter and graphic designer. In her colour graphics, she used strong contrasts creating images resembling collages. She decorated a number of Danish buildings, including the pulpit in Gimsing Church near Struer, and designed scenery for the Folketeatret's experimental stage.

== Early life and education ==
Born in Gentofte on 12 April 1927, Helle Thorborg was the daughter of the parliamentary secretary Johannes Levinsen Thorborg (1896–1992) and Grete Fog (1903–1993). She was brought up in an academic environment. Despite the scepticism of her family, she was set on becoming an artist. From 1947 to 1954, she attended the Royal Danish Academy of Fine Arts, studying painting and graphics under Aksel Jørgensen and Holger J. Jensen. In 1954, she married the architect Carl Henry Beckmann with whom she had three children, Gertrud (1956), Laurids Reidar (1957) and Marius Ingvar (1959).

== Career ==
Thorborg first exhibited at the Charlottenborg autumn show in 1952 and, encouraged by art dealer Viggo Clausen, had her first solo exhibition at Clausens Kunsthandel in 1954 which attracted graphic artists. It was there that she sold most of her works. In 1958, she became a member of Koloristerne, a group of colourist painters, presenting works at their 1959 exhibition.

She also participated regularly at the Thisted Exhibition when at her farmhouse in Thy. It was there she found inspiration working with local artists such as the photographer Kirsten Klein, as well as with those who spend their holidays there. Together with the Graphic Artists Association (Grafiske Kunstnersamfund), she also exhibited in Europe, the United States and Chile.

Thorborg's sensitivity can be seen in her illustrations of García Lorca's Blodbryllup. Her art has developed from naturalistic to a more abstract approach. In addition to her graphic works, she has also created watercolours and drawings, especially those of old bottles and other objects she found washed up on the beach during her long stays in Thy. While her creations have usually been quite small, in 1988 she completed the extensive decoration of the pulpit in Gimsing Church near Struer. In 1984, she won first prize in the Danish National Bank's contest for design new bank notes although her submission was not used. She has also designed stage sets and has written many articles, often illustrating the catologues of the Danish Colourist Society.

Following an exhibition by the Danish Colourists in 2007, in 2015, her work was exhibited at the Kunstforeningen in Lyngby, the town where Thorborg now lives.

== Death ==
Thorborg died on 13 November 2026, at the age of 98.

== Awards ==
Thorborg received several awards including the Tagea Brandt Rejselegat (1981), the Eckersberg Medal (1990) and the Anne Marie Telmányi prize (1994).
