= Toldbodgade 5 =

17th-century property in central Copenhagen

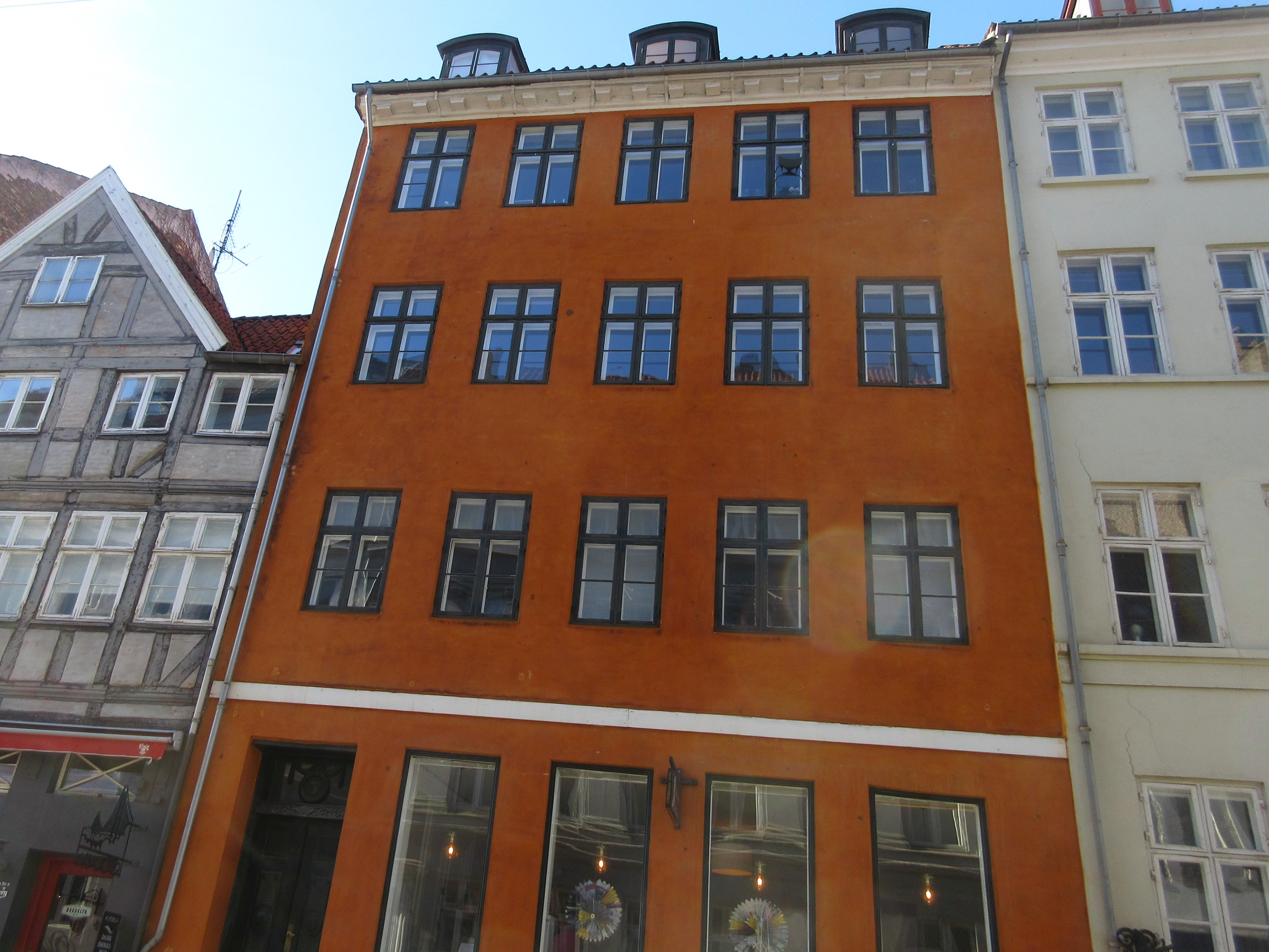
- Interactive map of the Toldbodgade 5 area

General information
- Location: Copenhagen, Denmark
- Coordinates: 55°40′48.25″N 12°35′29.4″E
- Completed: 18th century

Toldbodgade 5 is a 17th-century property situated in Toldbodgade, off Nyhavn in central Copenhagen, Denmark. It was listed in the Danish registry of protected buildings and places in 1977. The composer Carl Nielsen and the sculptor Anne Marie Carl-Nielsen resided in the apartment on the first floor from 1898 to 1906.

== History ==
=== 18th century ===
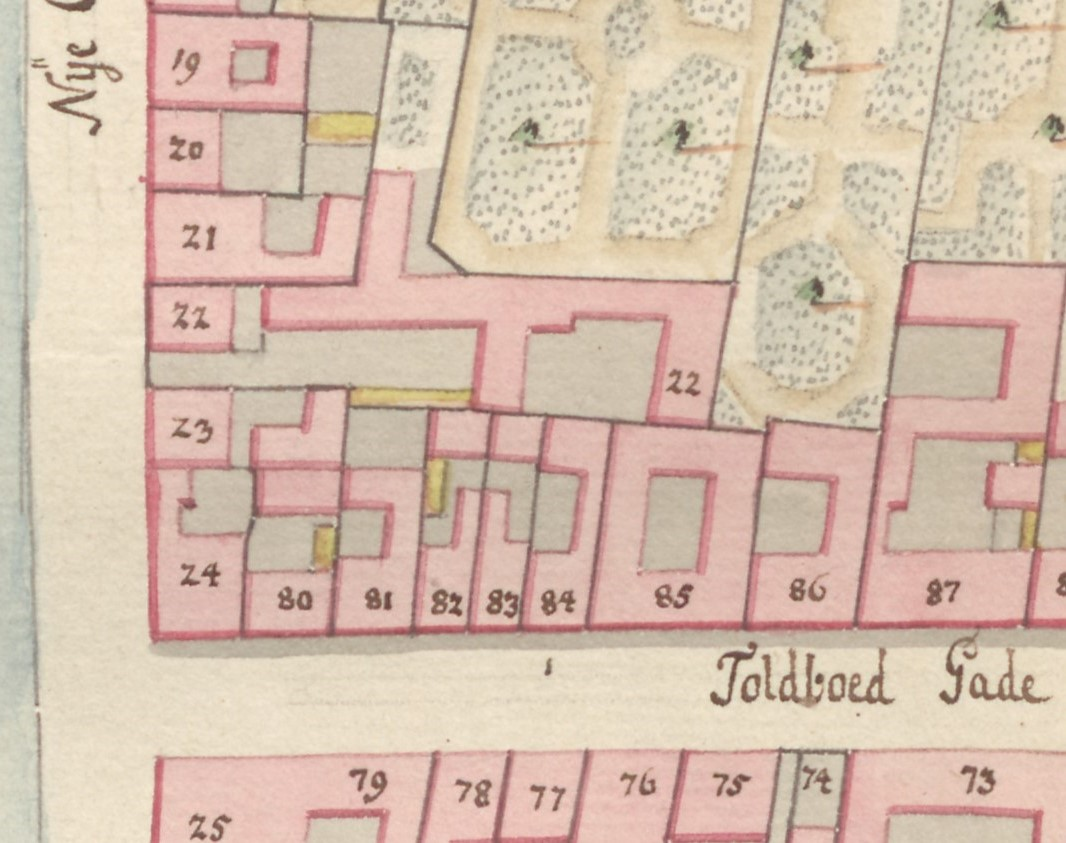
No. 81 seen in a detail from Christian Gedde's map of St. Ann's Rast Quarter, 1757

In the late 17th century, the site was part of a much larger property. This property was known as No. 27 in St. Ann's East Quarter (Sankt Annæ Øster Kvarter) in 1689 and owned by admiral Marcus Rodsten. The current building on the site was constructed with two storeys some time between 1716 and 1735 for merchant Peder Aarøe. In the new cadastre of 1756, it was listed as No. 81. It was owned by captain Niels Olsen Hielte at the time. Niels Olsen Hielte captained a number of expeditions to China for the Danish Asiatic Company. On his return to Copenhagen in 1763 with the frigate Prins Friderich, he was accompanied by a young Javanese fisherman whom they had rescued after his boat had wrecked, and Hielte later took care of him. The young man was Frederik Christian and later assumed the family name Bendahl after his native village of Benda. He later settled in Nykøbing S, where he bought a house, married and had seven children.

At the time of the 1787 census, No. 81 was home to three households. Maria Clara Kreydahl, a 36-year-old widow and the owner of the property, resided there with her seven-year-old son Kiel Fridrich Kreydahl, her 26-year-old sister Karen M. Rindm, the poor 13-year-old girl Jacobine Rønning and two maids. Peder Krag, the 31-year-old captain of a chinaman, resided in another apartment with his 21-year-old wife Johanna, their one-year-old son Jens Krag, his 26-year-old brother Christian Krag (a first mate, styrmand) and two maids. Eilert J.Wandahl, a beer seller (øltapper), resided in the basement with his wife Berte Gustavis, one maid and two lodgers. Both of the lodgers were sailors.

The property was expanded with two additional storeys in 1793.

=== 19th century ===
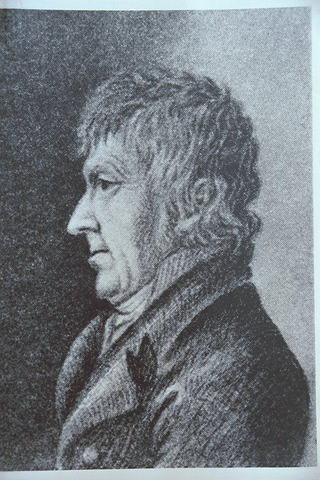
Fredrik Nannestad Wexels

Before 1801, the property was acquired by Frederik Wexels, manager of the Glass Magazine in Copenhagen. At the time of the 1801 census, he resided in the building with his wife Bolette Cathrine Balling, their four children (aged one to 13), the 26-year-old office clerk Hans Hamer Klemp and three maids. Joachim Bohman, a merchant, resided in another apartment with his wife Marie Eleonore Jacobsen, their three children (aged 10 to 17), two more children (aged nine and 11), one maid and an 18-year-old black servant. Jens Olsen, an assistant, resided in the building with his wife, a maid and a five-year-old boarder. Peter Henrichsen Kiær, a beer seller (øltapper) resided in the basement with his wife Johanne Margrethe Røder and their four children (aged one to 12).

In the new cadastre of 1806, the property was listed as No. 49. It was still owned by Frederik Wexels at that time. In 1809, he was appointed as manager of the glass works in Norway. His son was the clergyman Wilhelm Andreas Wexels.

=== Jens and Louise Frederikke Jensen ===
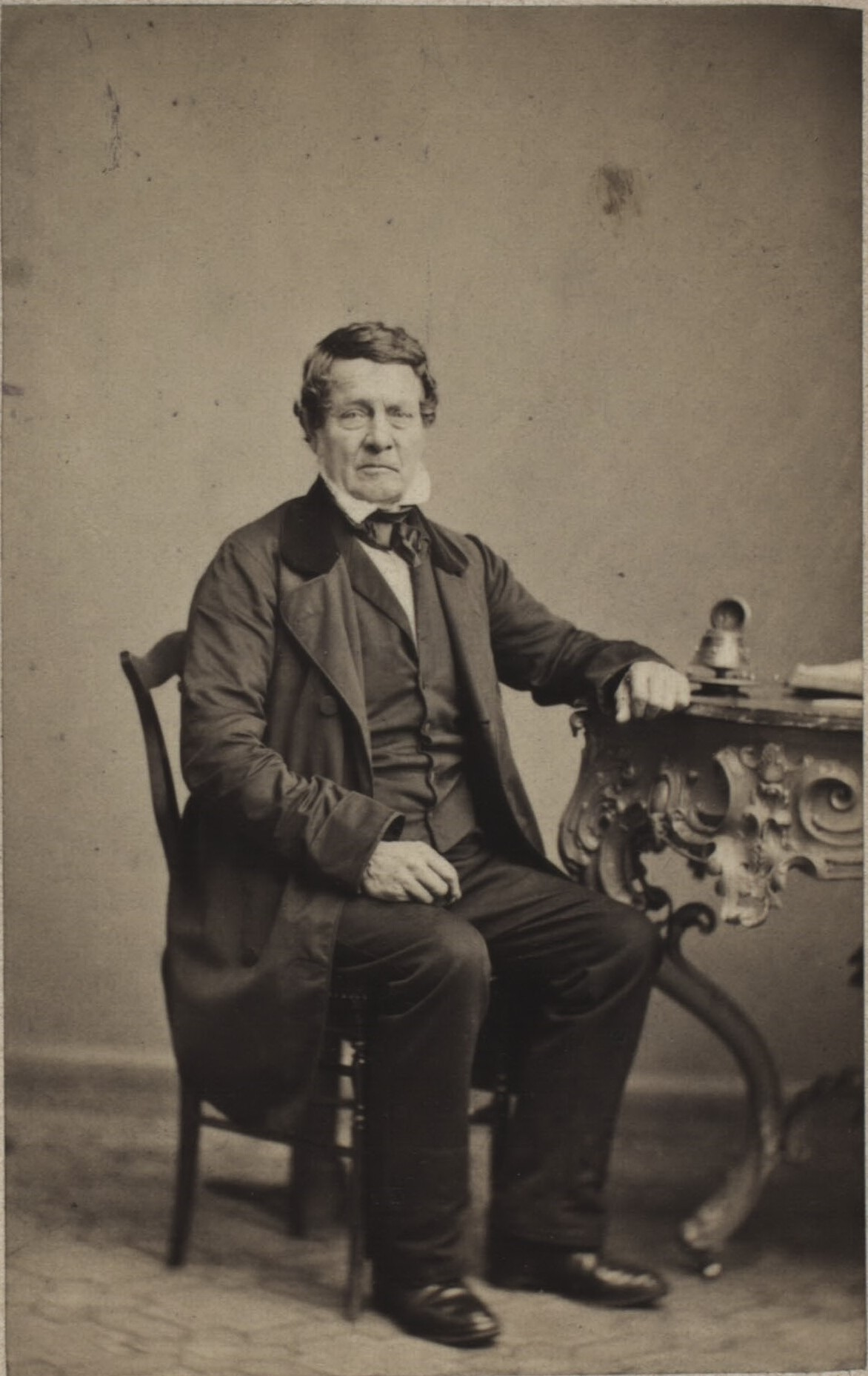
Jens Jensen

At the time of the 1834 census, No. 49 was home to five households. Jens Jensen (1792–) and Louise Frederikke Jensen (née Steenberg, 1799–1870), two school teachers, resided on the third floor with their two children (aged 10 and 12), the 24-year-old female teacher Johanne Oline Kjelsen and one maid. Niels Knudsen, a skipper, resided on the second floor with his wife Ane Cathrine (née Hall), their four children (aged 14 to 22), one maid and one lodger. Hans Hansen Rønne, a ship captain, resided on the first floor with his wife Cathrine Maria Rønne (née Brandt), their four children (aged nine to 22) and one maid. Maria Tomasin Hammer (mée Rønne), a 59-year-old widow seamstress and most likely a sister of the captain on the first floor, resided on the ground floor with one maid and one lodger. Jens Sørensen, the proprietor of the tavern in the basement, resided in the associated dwelling with his wife Ane Catharine Trane and their four children (aged 11 to 21).

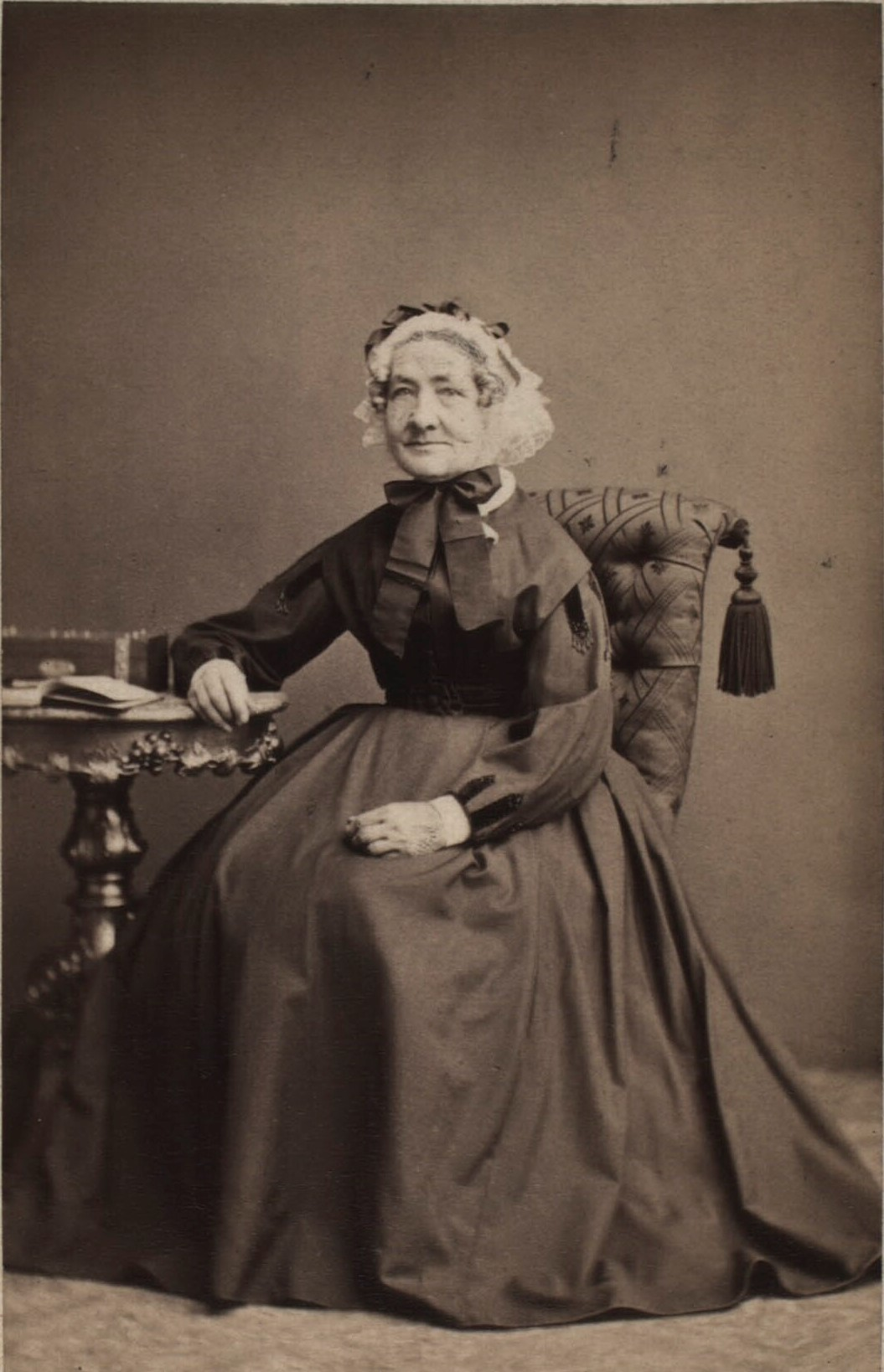
Louise Frederikke Jensen, née Steenberg

All the apartments were still occupied by the same families in 1840. Ane Charthrine Knudsen on the second floor had by then become a widow.

By 1845, Jens and Louise Jensen were still residing on the third floor. Karen Tolstrup (née Knutzen, 1786–1848), widow of kancelliråd Peder Tolstrup (1777–1833), was now residing on the second floor with her three children (aged 25 to 33) and one maid. Thora Odelia Wandel, Louise Amalie Wandel, Caroline Wandel—three unmarried sisters in their 30s—resided on the first floor with one maid. Hans and Christine Rønne were now residing in the ground floor apartment with two of their children and one maid. Frederikke Louise Beldt, a 46-year-old widow, was now managing the tavern in the basement. She resided in the associated dwelling with her four children (aged five to 14) and one maid.

At the time of the 1850 census, Jens and Louise Jensen were still residing on the third floor. Hans Christian Jakobsen, a ship captain, resided on the second floor with his wife Sophie Magdalene Jacobsen, their three children (aged one to ten), a maid and a wet nurse. Hans Jansøn Baagöe, another ship captain, resided on the first floor with his wife Elisabeth Baagöe, their two children (aged five and eight) and one maid. Peter Dirns, an Icelandic merchant, was also residing as a lodger on the first floor with the 71-year-old widow Karen Christine Meilbye, her daughter Anna Christine Meilbye and one maid. The tavern in the basement was still managed by Frederikke Lovise Jensen.

The property was home to 24 residents in six households at the 1860 census. Jens and Louise Frederikke Jensen resided in the building with their son Edvard Michael Jensen (music teacher), their daughter Emilie Marie Jensen (teacher) and one maid. Karen Elisabeth Lindberg, an unmarrid woman, shared another apartment with three siblings named Elberg (aged 15 to 19). The eldest of them, Tønnes Severin Theodor Elberg, would later become a journalist in Chicago. Arnold Møller and Carl Ludvig Ferdinand Lind, two businessmen in their early 30s, resided in a third apartment. Niels Nielsen, a workman, resided in the building with his wife Bertha Sophie Nielsen and their four-year-old son. Hans Christian Hansen, an archivist in the Ministry of Justice, resided in the building with his wife Martha Cecilia Hansen, their son Hans Peter Hansen (music and paper merchant), their daughter Elisabeth Maria Nathalia Hansen (widow), her four-year-old daughter and one maid. Sophie Ley, a widow, resided in the building with her 12-year-old daughter and two lodgers.

=== 20th century ===
The composer Carl Nielsen and sculptor Anne Marie Carl-Nielsen resided in the first floor apartment from 1898 to 1907.

== Architecture ==
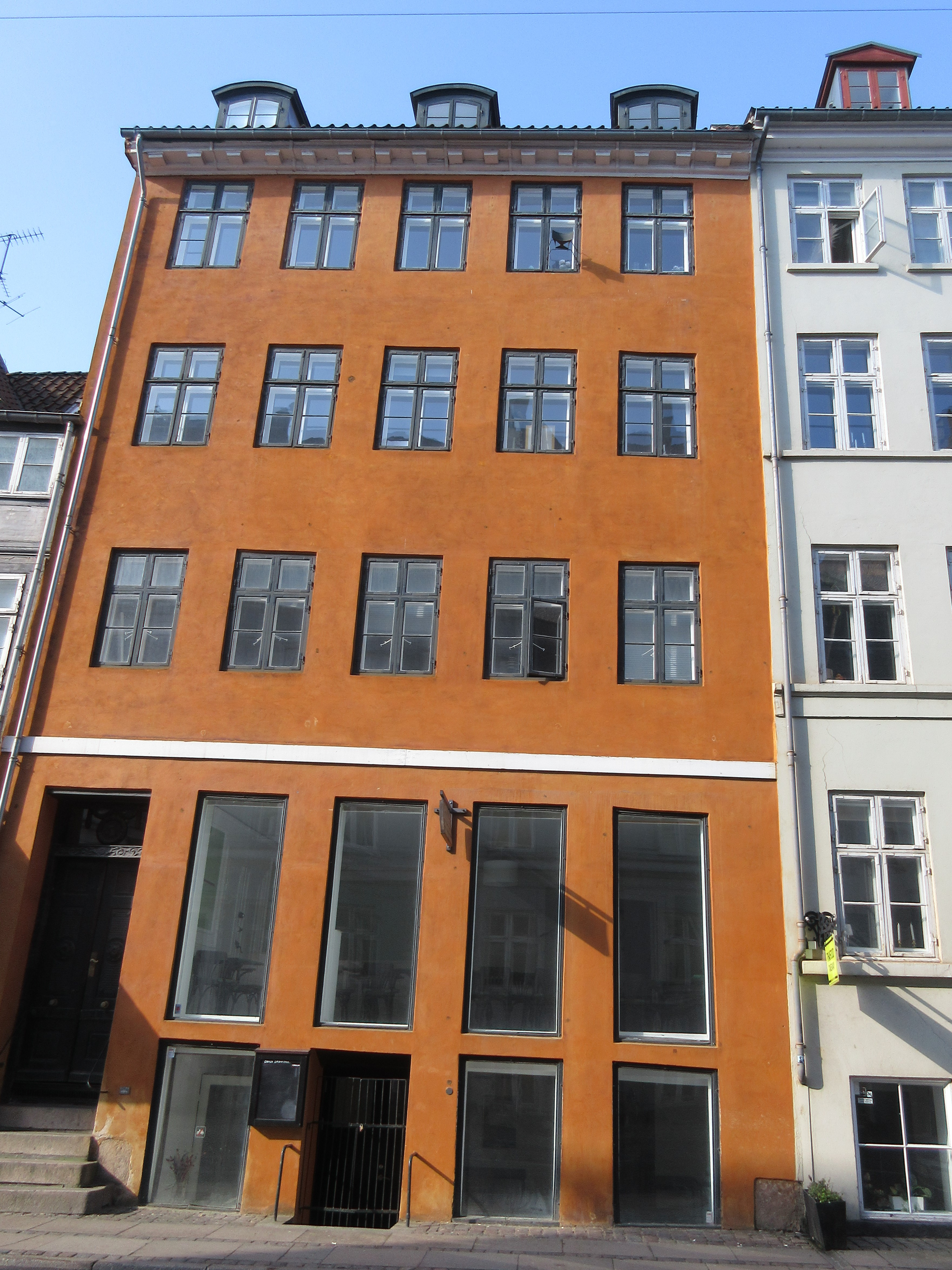
The building, seen from the other side of the street

Toldbodgade 5 is a three-winged complex, surrounding three sides of a narrow courtyard, constructed with four storeys above a walk-out basement. The three wings are integrated towards the courtyard by canted corner bays. The front, which is plastered and painted with iron vitriol, is finished with a white-painted belt course above the ground floor and a modillioned cornice. The main entrance in the bay furthest to the left is raised five steps from street level. The red tile roof features three dormer windows towards the street.

== Today ==
The property is owned by E/F Toldbodgade 5 today. Restaurant Carl Nielsen, a smørrebrød restaurant, is located in the basement.

== See also ==
- Kronprinsessegade
