= Studiestræde 24 =

Building in Copenhagen, Denmark

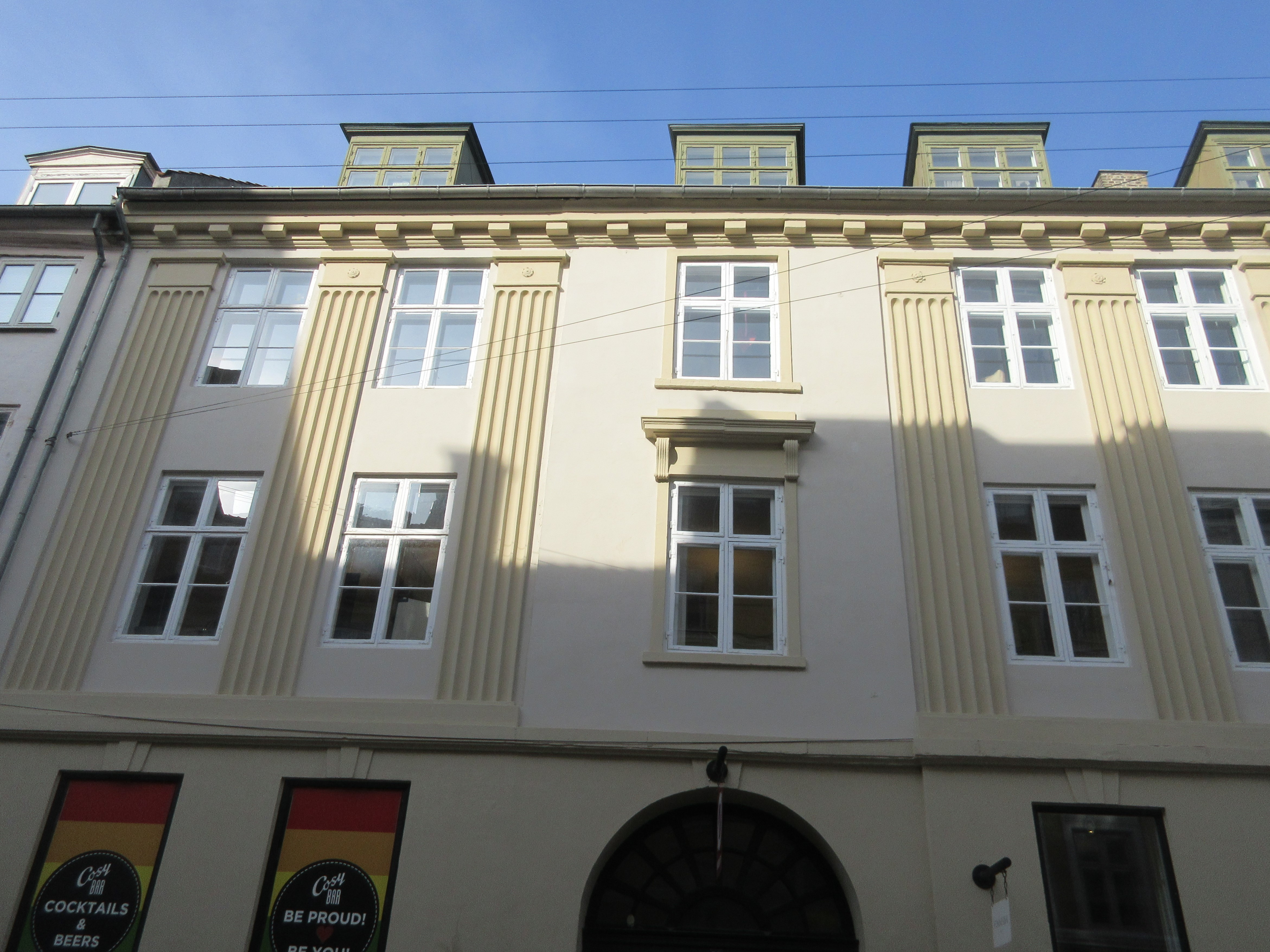
- Interactive map of the Studiestræde 24 area

General information
- Location: Copenhagen, Denmark
- Coordinates: 55°40′42.38″N 12°34′7.46″E
- Completed: 1798

Studiestræde 24 is a Neoclassical property on Studiestræde in the Latin Quarter of Copenhagen, Denmark. The building was listed in the Danish registry of protected buildings and places in 1959. The Red–Green Alliance is based in the building. Notable former residents include the painter Georg Hilker.

== History ==
=== Site history, 1689–1795 ===
Prior to the Copenhagen Fire of 1795, the site was made up of two properties. One of the properties was listed in Copenhagen's first cadastre from 1689 as No. 96 in Northern Quarter, owned by Frederik Knudsen. The other one was listed as No. 97, owned by a widow named Karen (widow of a baker). The old No. 96 was listed in the new cadastre of 1756 as No. 102 in Northern Quarter, owned by haulier Christopher Jørgensen. The old No. 96 was listed as No. 103, owned by master mason Ridder Folmer.

=== New building, 1795–1839 ===
The eastern part of the building was constructed in 1797–1798. The property was home to five households at the 1801 census. Paul Christian Christensen, a manufacturer of starch, resided in the building with his wife Maria Magdalene Christensen, their four-year-old son and one maid. Christiane Jensen, a widow and probably the owner of the property, resided on the first floor with two factory workers and two maids. Anne Marie Kratzenstein, another widow, resided in the building with her 15-year-old daughter and two maids. Arnold Ludevig Kobiersky, a grocer (spæjhøker), resided in the basement with his wife Anne Cathrine Wigersløv and their two daughters (aged 12 and 15). Johanne Marie Dreyers, another widow, resided in the building with her two daughters (aged 15 and 17), a maid and two unmarried women.

In the new cadastre of 1806, the property was listed as No. 88 in Northern Quarter. It belonged to a widow named Jensen at time.

The decoration painter Georg Hilker was a resident in the building in 1866–67.

=== Johannes Høyer ===
The property was later acquired by grocer (urtekræmmer) and starch manufacturer Johannes Høyer (1803–1857). His property was home to 15 residents in three households at the 1840 census. Høyer resided on the ground floor with his wife Caroline Høyer (née Kragerup, 1806–1879), their three children (aged two to seven), a grocer (urtekræmmersvend, employee), a grocer's apprentice, one male servant and two maids. Henriette Laursen, a widow with means, resided on the first floor with her sister Magna Løfler. Friedrich Christian Prehn, secretary and archivist in the Schleswig-Holstein-Lauenberg Chancellery, resided on the second floor with his wife Louise Prehn (née Gløerfeldt) and one maid.

Høyer's property was again home to three households at the 1850 census. Johannes and Caroline Høyer resided on the ground floor with their daughter Emma, their Son Efward, Høyer's factory manager Otto Christian Theorned, two grocer's apprentices, a male servant and two maids. Henriette Lovsen and her sister Magna Løfter still lived in the first-floor apartment. Frederikke Christine Schmidt (née von Ludsou), resided on the second floor with her daughters Ludovika and Caroline Schmidt, her sister Martha von Lütezour and niece Sophia Von Lütezour.

Caroline Høyer was still the owner of the building at the 1860 census. She lived in one of the apartments with her four children (aged 16 to 26) and the lodger Harry Kleilbuth. Wilhelm Julius Andersen, a grocer (urtelræmmer), resided on the ground floor with his employee Christian Olfert Nielsen. Johan Frederik Johansen, a divorced restaurateur, resided on the first floor with his nine-year-old son, an 11-year-old niece and two lodgers (one of them a cook, possibly an employee). Niels Mathiesen, a master mason, resided in the building with his 11-year-old son, a housekeeper and a maid.

On 11 August 1765, Høyer's daughter Pouline Christine Høyer (1840-) narried to the prominent furniture manufacturer Severin Jensen.

=== Theodor Rich ===
The property was later acquired by Theodor Rich (also referred to as P. Th. Rich). Om 1874, he had acquired the chemical-technical factory P. Sørensen & Co. (founded in 1852, whether it was already located at Studiestræde 24 when he bought it is not known). He established a chemical factory in Studiestræde 24 and some of the adjacent buildings. The product range included shoe polish, pomade, fish glue and baking powder.

Rich's building was home to 25 residents at the 1880 census. Frederik Ludvig Hansen, a businessman (grosserer), resided on the first floor with his wife Caroline Juliane Hansen, their three children (aged four to 14) and a senior clerk (employee). Edvard Sunckenberg, another businessman (mægler), resided on the second floor with his wife Constance Sunckenberg, their 13-year-old son and one maid. H. R. Sørensen, a grocer (urtekræmmer), resided in the basement with an apprentice. Niels Petersen (no profession mentioned) and Dorthea Petersen resided on the first floor of the side wing with their four children (aged six to 12) and a lodger. Henrik Jensen, a workman, resided on the second floor of the side wing with his wife Henriette Frederikke Jensen and his three children (aged one to 13).

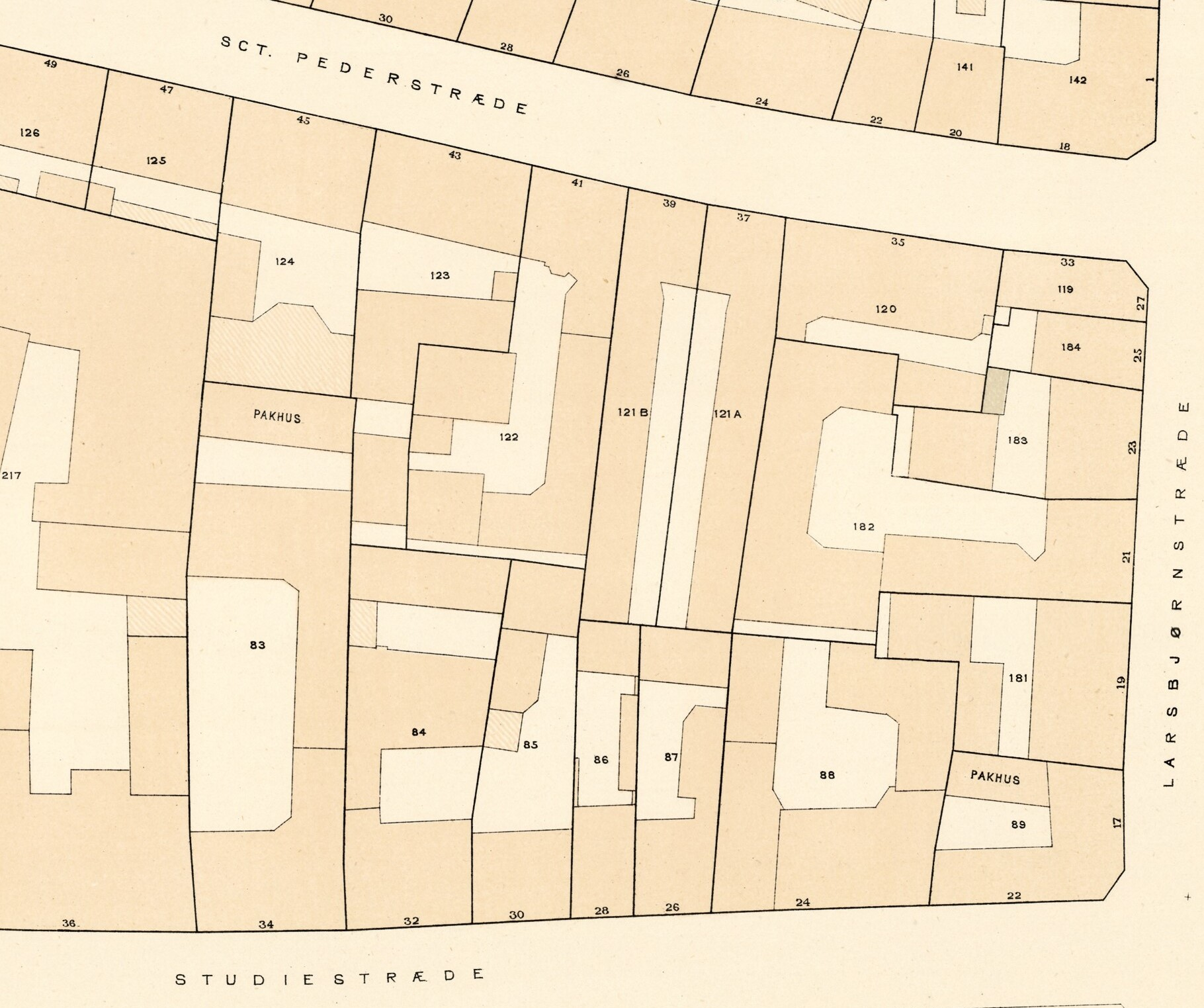
The property seen on a detail from one of Berggreem's block plans of Northern Quarter, 1886–88.

In 1887–99, Rich expanded the building westwards. In 1904, Rich took his sons Axel and Einer Rich as partners. The firm was from then on also known as Th. Rich & Sønner. The factory was later continued by his descendants and remained at the site for more than 80 years.

=== Later history ===
The building was later for many years home to Nordisk Hustelefonfabrik. It was also the first Danish premises of Dutch company Philips (1926) and Swedish company L. M. Ericsson (1930). The printing business Kruckow-Waldorff A/S (originally Sophus Kruckow) was another tenant.

The Communist Workers Party purchased the entire building in 1978. The publishing house Oktober and the newspaper Arbejderavisen were also based in the building. They were from around 1980 joined by the image bureaus Alfa and 2. Maj were also based in the building on the upper floors. The Communist Workers Party's premises were in 1989 taken over by the Red–Green Alliance.

== Architecture ==
The building is seven bays wide. The five eastern bays date from 1798 while the two western ones date from the extension in 1887–88. The facade is decorated with seven Ionic pilasters.

== Today ==
The Red–Green Alliance is still headquartered in the building.
