= Københavns Skipperforening =

- Formation: 1634
- Headquarters: Copenhagen, Denmark
- Alderman: Leon Møller Jensen
- Website: skipperlaug.dk

Københavns Skipperforening (lit. 'Copenhagen Skippers' Association'), formerly Københavns Skipperlav (Copenhagen Skippers' Guild), is an organisation for skippers in Copenhagen, Denmark. Its former headquarters at the corner of Bremerholm and Holmens Kanal, a brick building from 1796, was listed on the Danish registry of protected buildings and places by the Danish Heritage Agency on 23 December 1918 and was sold to Danske Bank in 1930. The association is now based at Australiensgade in Østerbro.

== History ==
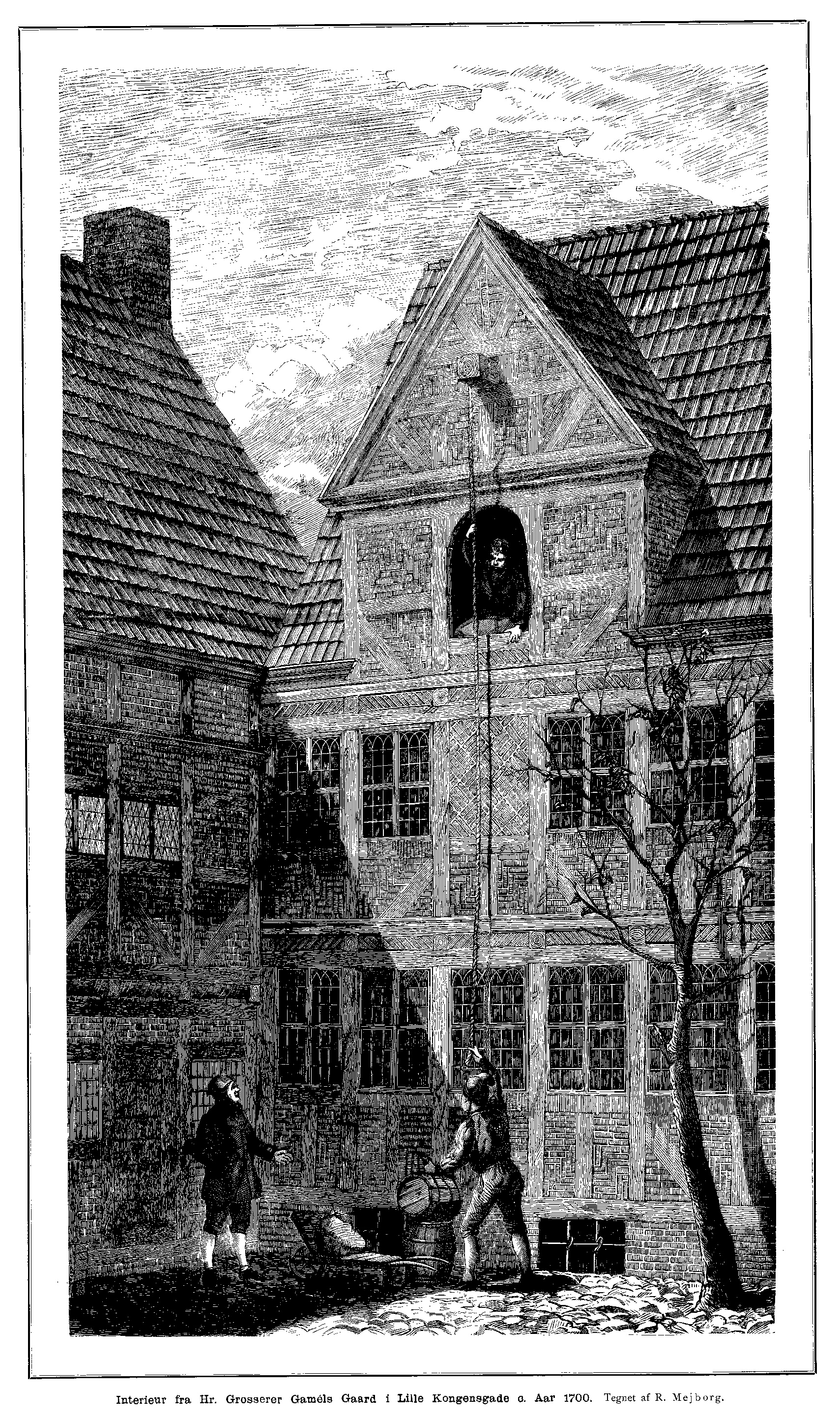
The Skippers' Guild Hall in Lille Kongensgade seen on an illustration from Illustreret Tidende from 1881

The Copenhagen Skippers' Guild was founded on 22 December 1634. The guild was to be consulted on all matters related to shipfaring to and from Copenhagen and also acted as a maritime court in connection with disputes.

The guild acquired a building at Lille Kongensgade 33 in 1665. It was a Renaissance-style building from 1605.

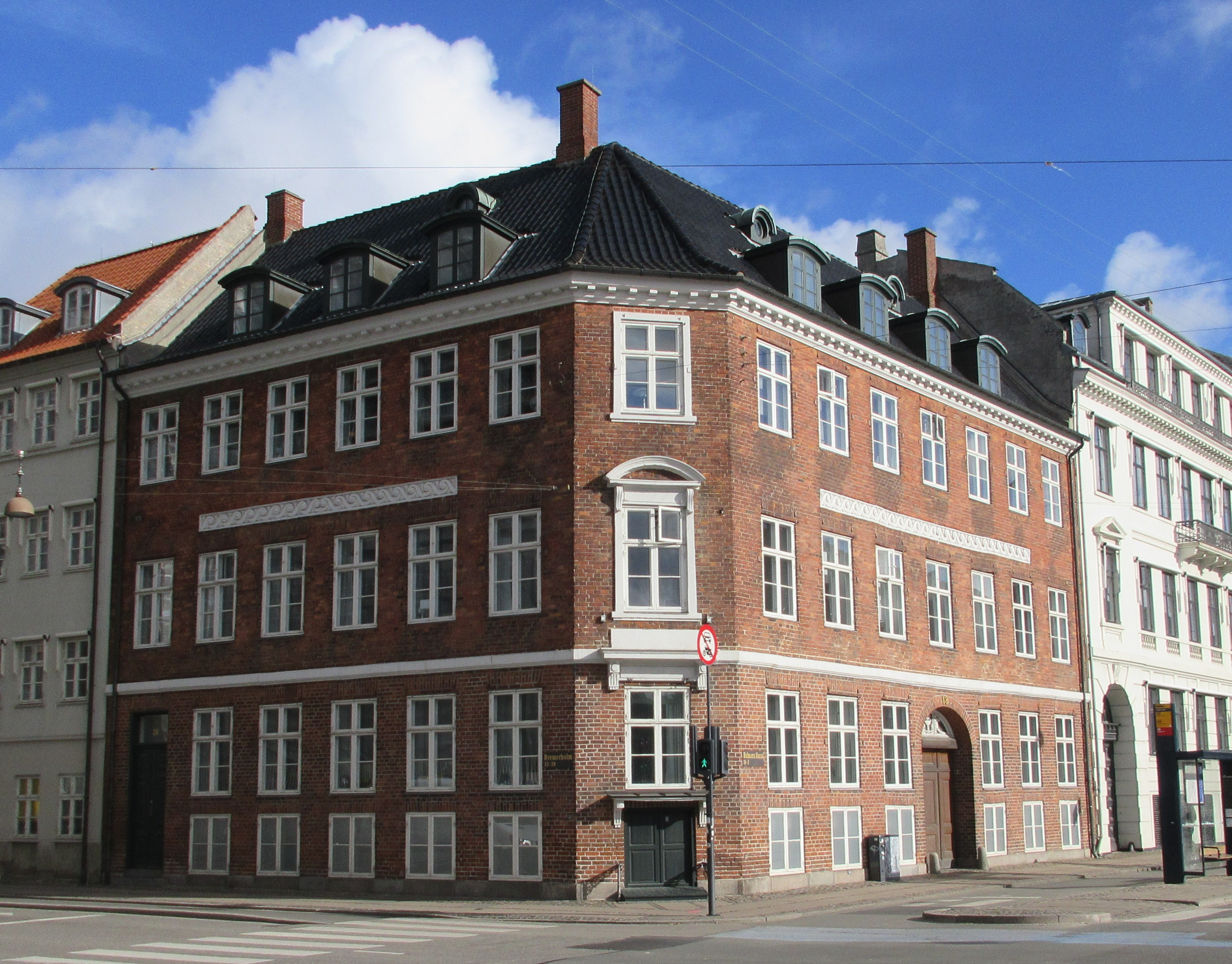
The now listed former headquarters at the corner of Bremerholm and Holmens Kanal

The guild sold its building on Lille Kongensgade in 1804 and it was later demolished in 1881–82. The new headquarters of the Skippers' Association was located at the corner of Holmens Kanal (No. 18) and Bremerholm (No. 39), at 55°40′39″N 12°35′04″E. It was built for the merchant Christen Larsen in 1796. The building has six bays towards Bremerholm, a single-bay chamfered corner and seven bays towards Holmens Kanal.

The guild changed its name to Københavns Skipperforening and a new set of statues was adopted in 1863. This happened in response to the new Maritime Trade Act of 1861 (Sønæringslov af 1861). Danske Bank acquired the building 1930, and the Skippers' Association then moved to Australiensgade in Østerbro.

== Aldermen ==
No.	Year	Elderman
1.	1645–1657	Jørgen Ravn
2.	1657–1661	Morten Pedersen
3.	1661–1666	Thord Andersen
4.	1667–1681	Svend Mortensen
5.	1681–1682	Ole Olsen
6.	1681–1682	Kristen Kristensen
7.	1683–1685	Hans Gregersen
8.	1685–1694	Peder Madsen
9.	1694–1697	Peder Andersen Stud
10.	1697–1698	Isaach Boucher
11.	1698–1703	Frants Albertsen
12.	1703–1711	Peder Madsen
13.	1711–1716	Peder Hendriksen
14.	1716–1730	Kristian Kruse
15.	1730–1734	Iver Thomsen Grue
16.	1734–1735	Jørgen Kruse
17.	1735–1736	Ernst Brandt (interim)
18.	1736-1736	Peder Jonsen (interim)
19.	1736–1740	Jørgen Fenger
20.	1741–1754	Ernst Brandt
21.	1754–1769	Kristen Hellesen
22.	1769–1801	Jacob David Kiølsen
23.	1801–1824	Lorentz Peter Wall
24.	1824–1831	Niels Toucher
25.	1831–1844	Henning Rønne
26.	1844–1850	A. Stæger
27.	1850–1856	Christen Jacobsen Leth
28.	1857–1871	Claus Børnsen
29.	1872–1875	H.J. Baagøe
30.	1875–1884	J.L. Barfred
31.	1884–1900	Hans Frederik Munch Harboe
32.	1900–1914	Andreas Valdemar Knudsen
33.	1914–1931	Jacob C. F. Linnemann Møller
34.	1932–1944	Svend Prip
35.	1944–1971	H.L. Rosfeldt
36.	1971–1981	Knud Poulsen
37.	1981–1991	Anker Pdersen
38.	1991–2004	Anton Vognsen
39.	2004–2005	Bent Rasmussen
40.	2005–2008	Eigil Gøbel
41	2008–2016	Gunnar B. Sørensen
42.	2016–	Leon Møller Jensen
