= Ryvangen Memorial Park =

Danish Memorial for Nazi victims

Coordinates: 55°43′33″N 12°34′02″E

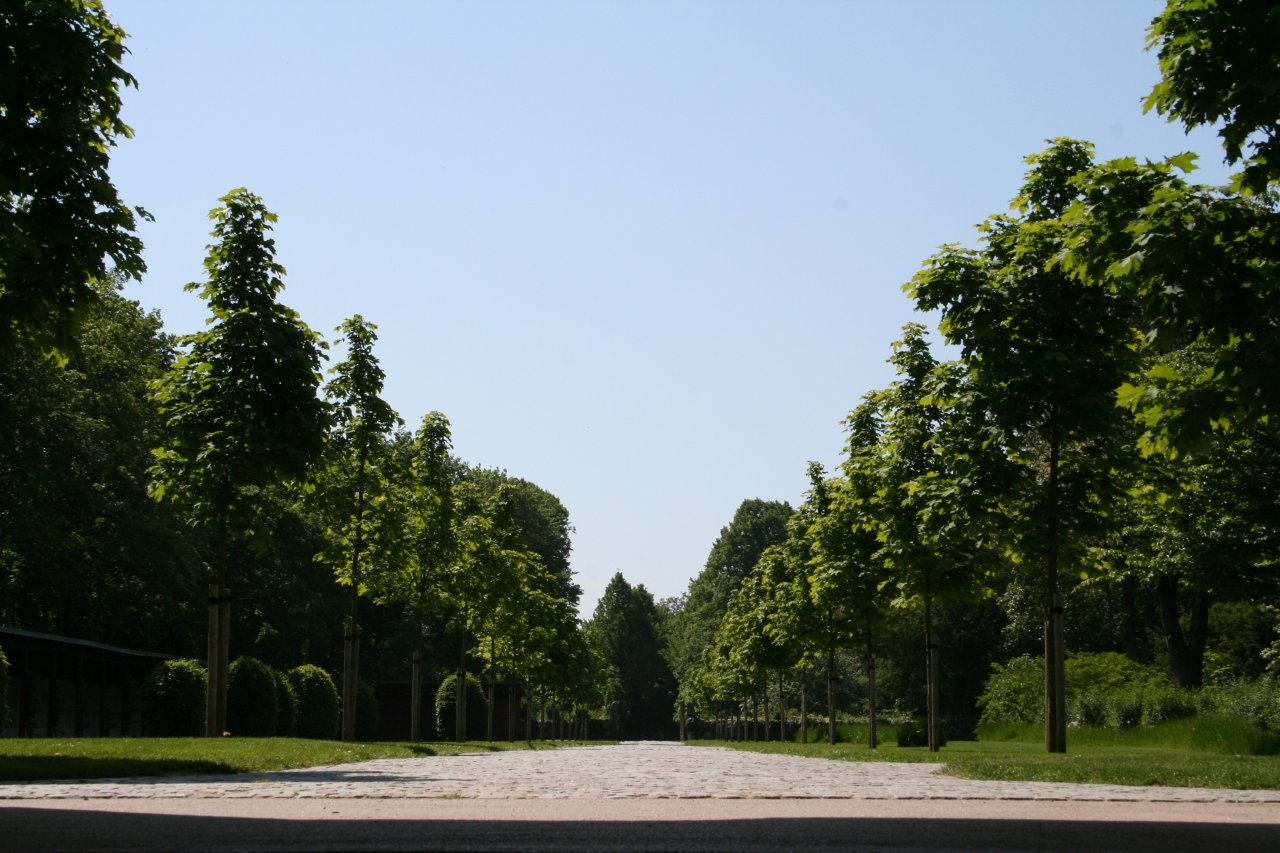
Entrance to Mindelunden

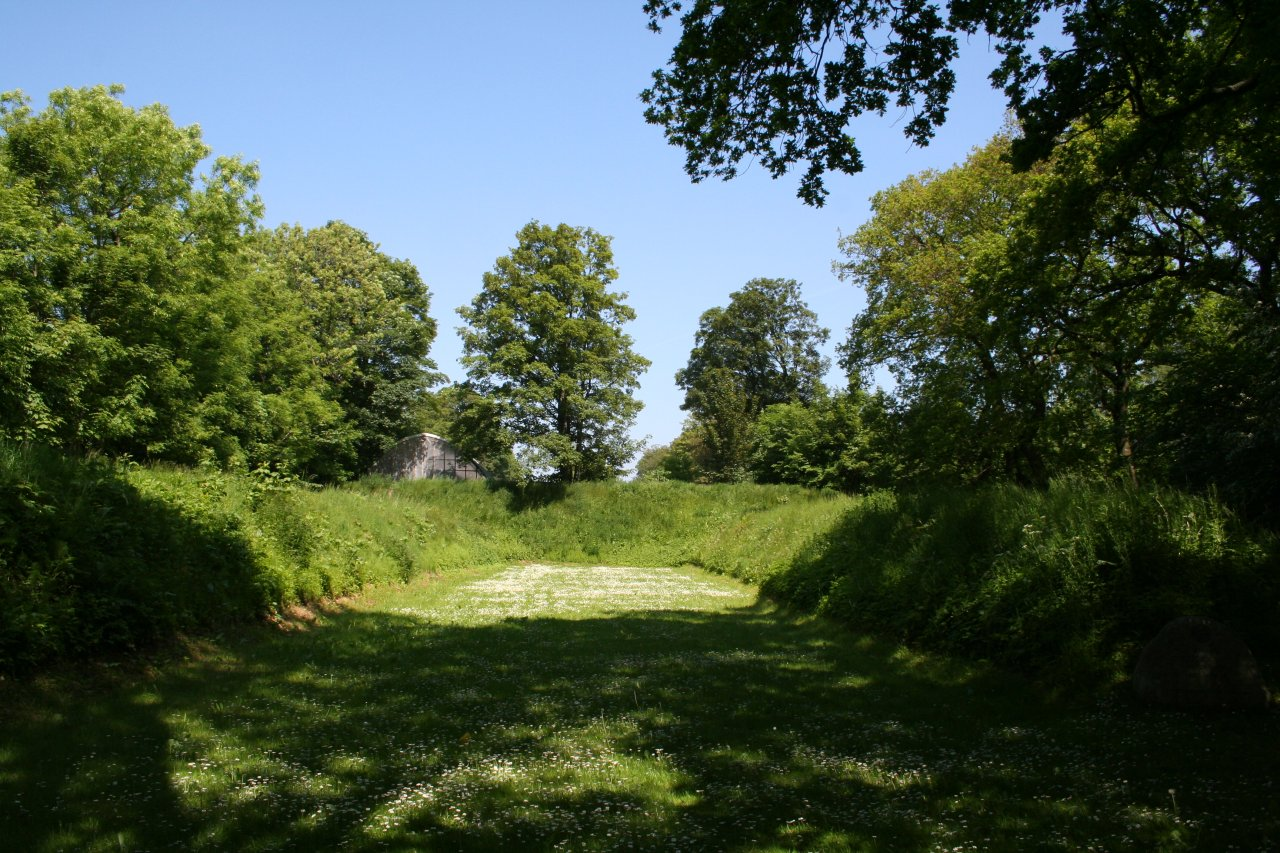
The pistol firing range

Ryvangen Memorial Park (Danish: Mindelunden i Ryvangen) is a memorial park in Ryvangen officially inaugurated on 5 May 1950 to commemorate fallen members of the Danish resistance to the German occupation of Denmark during World War II.

The location in Ryvangen, which means "rye field", was acquired in 1893 by the army for a barracks and exercise field.

On 29 August 1943, when the Danish cooperation with Germany broke down, the German occupying forces seized the army and naval facilities in all of Denmark including Ryvangen.

While the German army used the barracks for themselves, part of the exercise field was used as an execution and burial site for members of the Danish resistance.

The execution site consisted of three wooden poles to which the condemned were tied and executed by firing squad.

On 5 May 1945, in connection with the liberation, members of the resistance came to Ryvangen and only then did the public get confirmation that the executions of the German occupying forces had taken place there.

The Comrades' Relief Fund writes that, on 5 May, members of the resistance discovered 202 graves in Ryvangen and that the minister for ecclesiastical affairs had the remains exhumed for identification.

After the liberation the site was converted to a cemetery and memorial park for the resistance members who were executed there or were otherwise killed. In connection with the burials there, the site was referred to as Mindekirkegaarden i Ryvangen (Ryvangen Memorial Cemetery). The bereaved could choose to have the remains buried at the memorial park or at a cemetery closer to home.

On 29 August 1945, two years after the German occupiers had dissolved the Danish army and navy, 106 hearses thus drove from the Christiansborg Riding Grounds through Copenhagen to the memorial park in Ryvangen with the flags in the city flying half-mast. Bishop Hans Fuglsang-Damgaard inaugurated the park as a cemetery with the Danish royal family, the government and representatives from the resistance movement present at the funerals.

In the center of the grave field lies a memorial stone for the 91 resistance members who were exhumed in Ryvangen and buried in a cemetery closer to home.

The remains of 31 resistance members who died in German prisons and concentration camps are also buried here. The pergola along the eastern border of the park has a memorial wall with 151 plaques, one for each of the 151 Danish resistance members whose remains have never been found.

On 24 December 1949 the newly formed Home Guard held a memorial service for the victims of the occupation in the memorial park. Every Christmas Eve since then the Home Guard holds a memorial service there.

== History ==
Arne Sørensen, minister for ecclesiastical affairs, took the initiative to create the memorial park at the former execution and burial site. The park was designed by Kaj Gottlob, the garden by Aksel Andersen. On 5 May 1950, five years after the liberation, the park was finished and officially inaugurated. On every liberation day since then, the Comrades' Help Foundation holds a memorial service in the park.

== Monuments and memorials ==
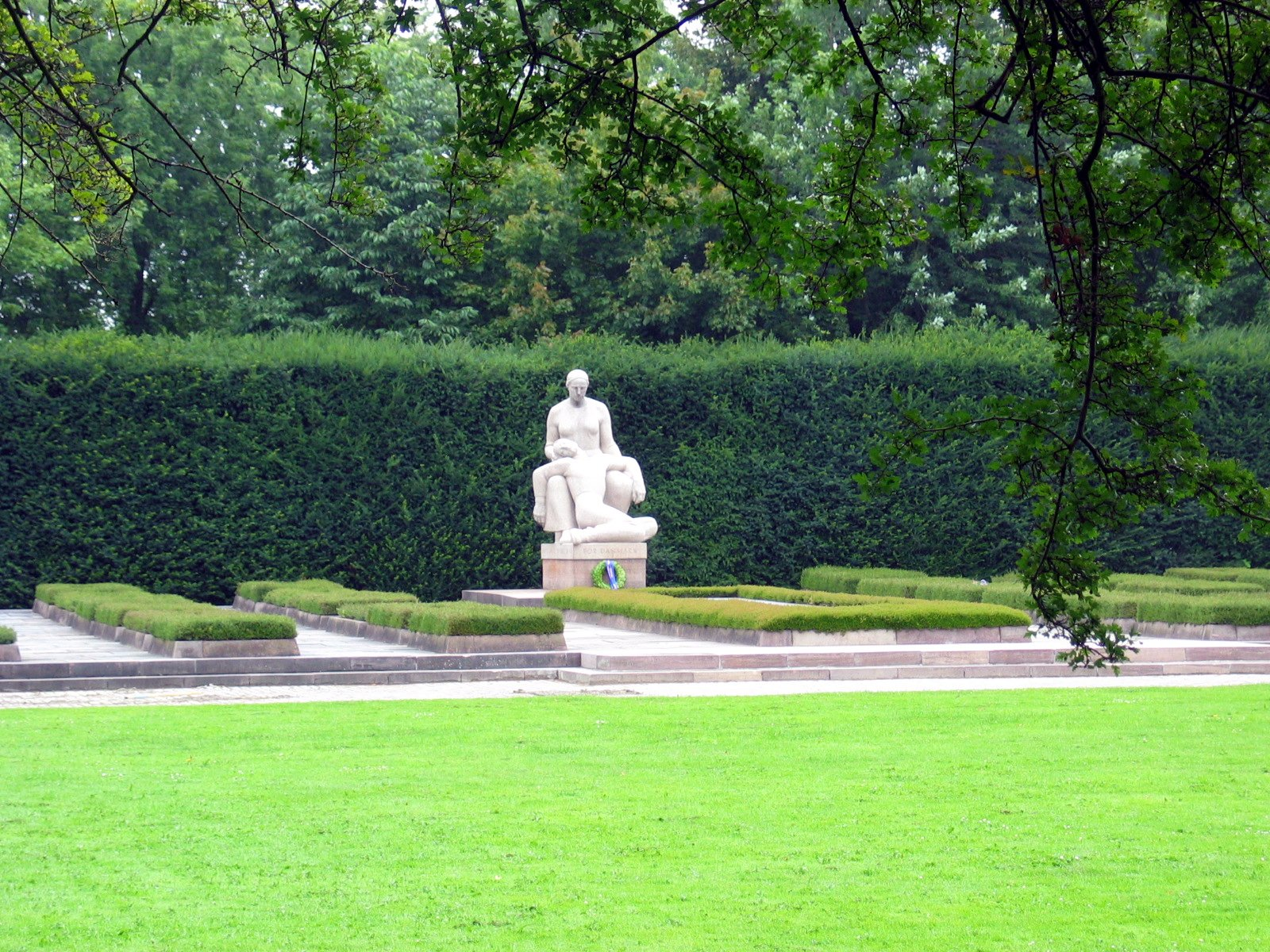
Burial site

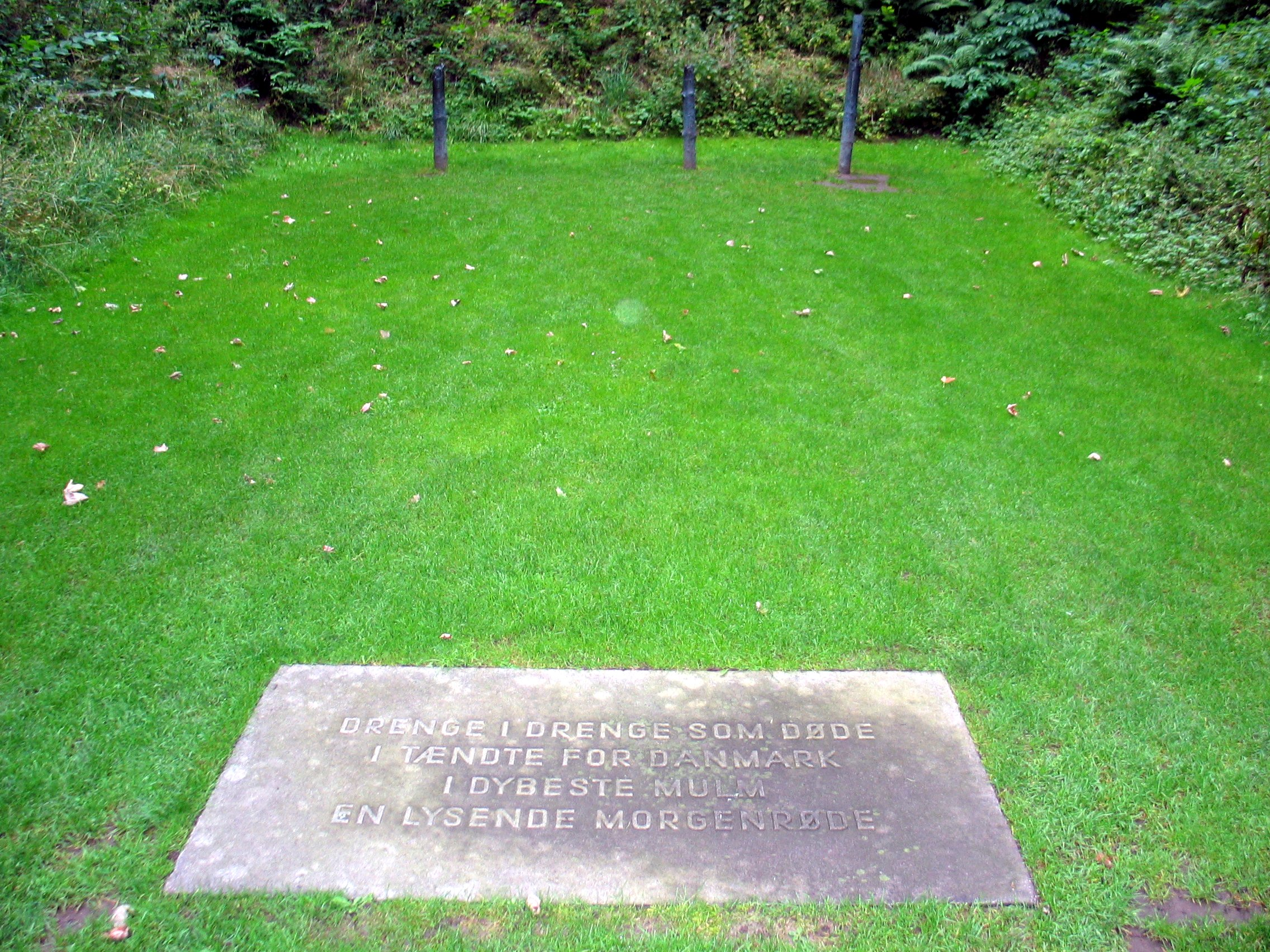
Execution site with commemorative plaque

The sculptor Axel Poulsen created the monument For Denmark / The mother with the slain son (For Danmark / Moderen med den dræbte søn) located centrally in the park.

In addition to the tombstones, the park has a number of memorial stones and plaques, with a large communal plaque at the center. At the execution site the wooden execution poles were replaced by bronze duplicates, and a commemorative plaque with a verse by Kaj Munk has been laid down there. The inscription translates literally to:

Boys you boys who died
You lit for Denmark
in the darkest gloom
a shining rosy dawn

(Drenge I drenge som døde / I tændte for Danmark / i dybeste mulm / en lysende morgenrøde).

== Burials ==
=== The large grave field with 106 graves ===
In addition to the 105 resistance members listed below, Harald Christensen was buried in Mindelunden on 29 August 1945. However, in 1950 prior to the official inauguration of the park, his remains were exhumed a second time and moved, leaving his grave empty. Similarly, Estvan Svend Aage Wehlast was buried in Mindelunden on 29 August 1945, but less than a year later exhumed a second time and reburied elsewhere. The official list of resistance members buried in Ryvangen does not include Christensen nor Wehlast.

- Erik Gerhard Andersen
- John Erik Andersen
- Jørgen Arboe-Rasmussen
- Emil Balslev
- Hermann Møller Boye
- Karl Gustav Stricker Brøndsted
- Jørgen Buntzen
- Erik Caland
- Ib Mogens Bech Christensen
- Ole Christensen
- Preben Richard Christensen
- Erik Briand Clausen
- Erik Crone
- Gunnar Mogens Dahl
- Niels Louis Damsgaard
- Bent Faurschou-Hviid
- Poul Bernhard Finderup
- Ib Fischer
- Walter Svend Aage Florang
- Helge Emil Frederiksen
- Otto From-Petersen
- Peter Wessel Fyhn
- Poul Ib Gjessing
- Svend Glendau
- Hans Henrik Christian Gottschalch
- Preben Gylche
- Knud Erik Henning Gyldholm
- Preben Hagelin
- Jørgen Hall
- Kai Ole Hammerich
- Arne Lützen Hansen
- Christian Ulrik Hansen
- Orla Jens Christian Hansen
- Ejler Haubirk
- Kaj Ove Hedal
- Hans Jørgen Henriksen
- Poul Erik Hildahl
- Kaj Gersdorff Holbech
- Ejler Frederik Hurtigkarl
- Aksel Jensen
- Helge Ove Jensen
- Jørgen Juel Jensen
- Mølgaard Jensen
- Robert Jensen
- Svend Erik Jensen
- Svend Georg Borup Jensen
- Hans Robert Filip Johansen
- Steffen Harald Johansen
- Sven Jørgensen
- Thorkild Toftegaard Jørgensen
- Knud Klitbo
- Anton Laurits Emil Knudsen
- Jens Jørgen Jacob Koefoed
- Kaj Leo Kristensen
- Holger Nyhuus Kristoffersen
- Carl Jørgen Larsen
- Carl Jørgen Erik Skov Larsen
- Knud Larsen
- Poul Larsen
- Otto Egholm Lauritzen
- Cleving Benjamin Lindhardt
- Poul Boris Alex Madsen
- Kim Malthe-Bruun
- Peter Bogstad Mandel
- Povl Markussen
- Jens Jakob Wolf Martens
- Anne Louise (Lone) Christine Maslocha
- Lucian Maslocha
- Victor Bering Mehl
- Erik Koch Michelsen
- Svend Erik Mikkelsen
- Carl Mortensen
- Andreas Bronislaw Wadesloff Nielsen
- Arthur Nielsen
- Carl Alfred Nielsen
- Karl Edvard Nielsen
- Svend Otto Nielsen
- Erik Nyemann
- Leif Dines Pedersen
- Carl Petersen
- Carsten Leif Bruhn Petersen
- Henrik Wessel Platou
- Georg Quistgaard
- Svend Edvard Rasmussen
- Ludvig Alfred Otto Reventlow
  (Alternatively the burial in Mindelunden
  took place 6 September 1945)
- Ebbe Rørdam
- Kai Holger Schiøth
- Jørgen Haagen Schmith
- Steen Simonsen
- Eduard Frederik Sommer
- Per Sonne
- Niels Stenderup
- Lars Bager Svane
- Holger Otto With Søderberg
- Carl Borch Sørensen
- Carl Helmuth Preben Berg Sørensen
- Johan Jørgen Teilmann
- Jens Carl Thomsen
- Jørn Thomsen
- Svend Tronbjerg
- Sten Verland
- Carl Axel Vindum
- Niels Alexander von Wendt Rahbek
- Erik Henning Gunnar Widding
- Jørgen Frederik Winther

=== The memorial stone for 91 fallen resistance members ===
- Carl Erik Abel
- Lennart Ahlefeldt-Laurvig-Lehn
- Egon Andersen
- Ferdinand Emil Martin Andersen
- Henning Andersen
- Jørn Andersen
- Ole Bay Andersen
- Orla Andersen
- Agnes Viktoria Andreasen
- Poul Espen Bendtsen
- Finn Valdemar Bøsling
- Bent Christensen
- Carl Anders Christiansen
- Børge Walter Helmer Clausen
- Aage Emil Daugaard
- Frode Jens Dehn-Jensen
- Svend Vinding Dorph
- Hans Eeg
- Marius Anton Pedersen Fiil
- Niels Fiil
- Carl Emil Gregersen
- Peter de Hemmer Gudme
- Erik Stibolt Hansen
- Henning Børge Hansen
- Johan Kjær Hansen
- Poul Erik Krogshøj Hansen
- Svend Aage Hedeman Hansen
- Helge Carlo Harry Hermann
- Paul Petersen Holm
- Erik Christian Immanuel Holst
- Vagn Eigil Holst
- Vilhelm Hugo Hedemann Holst
- Albert Carlo Iversen
- Helge Broch Iversen
- Axel Carl Sophus Jacobsen
- Henry Jacobsen
- Hans Kristian Martin Jakobsen
- Bent Jensen
- Georg Emil Skovgård Jensen
- Hagbard Friis Jensen
- Jens Thue Jensen
- Michael Westergård Jensen
- Skjold Leo Alva Jensen
- Marius Peter Christian Jeppesen
- Kaj Søren Johansen
- Kai Johan Laurs Holst Jørgensen
- Alexander Keller
- Gunner Bernhard Malling Kier
- Niels Nielsen Kjær
- Karl Gustav Kolding
- Søren Peter Kristensen
- Børge Christian Larsen
- Einar Aksel Larsen
- Iver Peder Lassen
- Børge Johannes Lauritsen
- Jens Peter Funch Lind
- Preben Lytken Madsen
- Benny Randau Mikkelsen
- Ejner Ole Mosolff
- Asger Lindberg Mørup
- Eluf Preben Månsson
- Eigil Bruno Wendell de Neergaard
- Svend Haakon Niclassen
- Dagny Nielsen
- Hans Silas Nielsen
- Mogens Seierø Nielsen
- Poul Mackeprang Nielsen
- Svend Egon Nielsen
- Jørgen Bendt Nygaard
- Kaj Peter Cornelius Ohlsen
- Anders Christian Olsen
- Erik Pedersen
- Hans Christian Just Petersen
- John Hjalmar Wulff Petersen
- Knud Petersen
- Mogens Carl Christian Poulsen
- Jørgen Rydder
- Hans Brahe Salling
- Jørgen Eivind Schacht
- Bendt Stentoft
- Georg Vilhelm Jørgen Stougaard
- Aage Einar Strecker
- Herold Jensen Svarre
- Christian Fugl Svendsen
- Aage Søndergård
- Axel Sørensen
- Peder Bergenhammer Sørensen
- Eigil Kirstein Vistisen
- Henning Wieland
- Morten Wiltrup
- Helmer Andreas Fabricius Wøldike

=== The Memorial Wall for 151 missing resistance members ===
- Ivan Adriansen
- Aage August Agersted
- Peder Valdemar Ahnfeldt-Mollerup
- Stig Gustav Emil Anker Ammentorp
- Jens Albert Andersen
- Christian Andersen
- Ove Andersen
- Charles André Overgaard Andersen
- Jes Peter Asmussen
- Knud Hansen Barfod
- Hertha Bentzen
- Carl Julius Valdemar Berg
- Carly Anders Bertelsen
- Otto Johannes Bogh
- Viegand Moritz Bolvig
- Einar Jordt Brodersen
- Helge Georg Jensen Brünnich
- Per Heller Bunde
- Jacob Bøgh
- Christian Callesen
- John Thorvald Christensen
- Niels Christian Thy Christensen
- Abraham Clod-Hansen
- Ejvind Lundorff Dengsø
- Svend Carstensen Egebjerg
- Jørgen Esseman
- Karinus Johannes Felsted
- Tyge Eduard Fischer
- Kjeld Frederiksen
- Alfred Rasmussen Friis
- Holger Feldborg Gantriis
- Uffe Gehrke
- Aage Zinklar Gjødrik-Andersen
- Egon Glerup
- Arthur Gregersen
- Ejnar Grif
- Martin Jessen Grøn
- Robert Max Haagensen
- Carl Hammerich
- Ole Tidemann Hansen
- Agnes Jørgine Margrethe Hansen
- Viggo Emil Hansen
- Poul Hansen
- Evald Hansen
- Toke Kurt Hansen
- Thorvald Christian Hansen
- Ib Holm Hansen
- Arne Mikael Hansen
- Harald Frederik Valdemar Hein
- Henry Ingemann Martin Him-Jensen
- Carl Heinz Johannes Hocke
- Hakon Harboe Hygom
- Isak Vilhelm Hyttel Isaksen
- Romeo Andreas Lorenz Jacobsen
- Viggo Anders Jacobsen
- Poul Emil Rosenstand Jacobsen
- Josef Janecki
- Harry Keil Jensen
- Jens Peter Jensen
- Niels Peter Jensen
- Johannes Jensen
- Viggo Emil Jensen
- Hans Anders Jensen
- Helmuth Bartholdy Jensen
- Svend Aage Jensen
- Christian Jensen
- Otto Christian Jensen
- Ejler Johansen
- Kurth Elith Johansson
- Henning Jørgensen
- Arne Kjeld Jørgensen
- Edvard Charles Jørgensen
- Frits Camillo Herman Jørgensen
- Carl Kjerrumgaard Jørgensen
- Aksel Johannes Kaack
- Henry Suell Kiersgaard
- Ejnar Kirkegaard
- Povl Kisling-Møller
- Arnold Ingemann Kjær
- Erik Klindt
- Alfred Kristensen
- Poul Kristiansen
- Erik Jørgen Larsen
- Preben Holger Larsen
- Hans Frederik Larsen
- Niels Hieronymus Haae Laub
- Berting Sofus Madsen
- Hans Jørgen Madsen
- Aninus Marius Madsen
- Otto Theodor Vilhelm Malling
- Tage Fox Maule
- Harry Edvard Valdemar Mortensen
- Birger Mouritsen
- Villy Helmuth Møller
- Viggo Harald Møller
- Knud Henning Møller
- Elius Møller
- Svend Nicolajsen
- Peter Marensius Nielsen
- Egon Lykke Nielsen
- Erik Christian Schøtler Nielsen
- Albert Fritz Nielsen
- Henry Charles Anders Marius Nielsen
- Hans Bøge Nielsen
- Poul Hans Nielsen
- Niels Kristian Sand Nielsen
- Henry Nielsen
- Helge Elfred Norlin
- Kristian Nytorp
- Ole Georg Lauge Olsen
- Aage Helge Olstrup
- Ernst Peter Oskar Persson
- Christian Marius Petersen
- Ole Abildgaard Petersen
- Knud Aage Rosenberg Petersen
- Jørgen Palm Petersen
- Jørgen Bøhm Prip
- Axel Carl Dusinus Rasch
- Valdemar Kjeld Rasmussen
- Rasmus Peter Rasmussen
- Jørgen Preben Jensen Restrup
- Thorkild Ruby
- Adam Heide Salto
- Gustav Frederik Schaarup
- Axel Johan Viktor Scheiby
- Carl Christian Schou
- Poul Seidenfaden
- Søren Christian Jensen Serup
- Johannes Egerton Simonsen
- Fritz Christian Skipper
- Mogens Skov
- John Smith
- Arne Elesius Sode
- Erik Svendsen
- Henry Eppler Sørensen
- Ole Søren Sørensen
- Leo Sørensen
- Holger Robert Sørensen
- Jacob Thalmay
- Henry Christian Thomsen
- Villy Sigurd Holm Thomsen
- Jørgen Thorball
- Carl Marius Thøgersen
- Valdemar Vangsted
- Leif Steffen Vennike
- Erik Georg Westh
- Monica f. Massy-Beresford Wichfeld
- Knud Henrik Nicolai Vindel
- Aage Wodstrup
- Edvard Alexander Louis Zimmermann
- Jørgen Østergaard

=== The 31 KZ graves ===
- Hans Peter Andersen
- Carly Anders Bertelsen
- Holger Biehl
- Rasmus Axel Brus-Jørgensen
- Hedevig Alexandra Carlsen
- Laurits Holm Christensen
- Poul Johannes Christiansen
- Børge Anker Collin
- Erik Frederiksen
- Egil Fussing
- Poul Emil Gerner-Mikkelsen
- Leo Gnatt
- Johan Hansen
- Oliver Teddy Hansen
- Rune Ejvind Espetvedt Hansen
- Erik Bülow Hinrichsen
- Kai Jacobsen
- Kaj Arne Trolle Jacobsen
- Charles Frederik Larsen
- Otto Melchior
- Karl Kresten Nielsen
- Tage Vorsaa Nielsen
- Mads Arent Petersen
- Axel Rothe Petersen
- Boye Spetzler Petersen
- Kaj Snedker Rasmussen
- Leo Falk Simonsen
- Jørgen Staffeldt
- Erik Bondo Svane
- Poul Bengt Svendsen
- Viggo Wedel-Brandt

=== Others exhumed in Ryvangen ===
In addition to the 380 resistance members named above, the following were exhumed in Ryvangen after the liberation.

- Hans Otto Hausgaard Andersen
- Svend Olaf Lauge
- Mogens Rathjen
- Unidentified male
