= Svend Glendau =

Danish resistance member (1910–1945)

- Born: Svend Severinsen; 12 March 1910; Tim præstegaard, Denmark
- Died: 27 February 1945 (aged 34)
- Cause of death: Execution by firing squad
- Resting place: Ryvangen Memorial Park
- Occupation: Policeman
- Known for: Executed as member of the Danish resistance movement
- Parents: Peder Severinsen; Ellen Victoria Carla Nielsen
- Website: "Modstandsdatabasen" [Resistance Database]. Svend Glendau (in Danish). Copenhagen: Nationalmuseet.

Svend Glendau (12 March 1910 – 27 February 1945) was a member of the Danish resistance executed by the German occupying power.

== Biography ==
Glendau's membership of the resistance was betrayed to the Gestapo by Jørgen Børge Axel Lorenzen, leader of the Lorenzen Group and on 13 January 1945 Glendau was arrested.

On 27 February 1945 Glendau and nine other resistance members were executed in Ryvangen.

== After his death ==
On 29 August 1945 Glendau and 105 other victims of the occupation were given a state funeral in the memorial park founded at the execution and burial site in Ryvangen where he was executed. Bishop Hans Fuglsang-Damgaard led the service with participation from the royal family, the government and representatives of the resistance movement.

On 19 September 1947 a memorial wall in the Copenhagen Police Headquarters with the names of 157 policemen who lost their lives during the occupation including that of Glendau was inaugurated.

Similarly, a memorial plaque for Glendau was mounted at the police station in Antonigade 11.
