= Erik Crone =

Erik Crone may refer to:

- Erik Crone (actor) (1896–1971), Danish actor
- Erik Crone (resistance member) (1919–1945), Danish resistance member executed in 1945
- Erik Crone (film producer) (1946–2022), Danish film producer
