= Karl Gustav Stricker Brøndsted =

Member of the Danish resistance movement

- Born: Karl Gustav Stricker Brøndsted; 13 December 1915
- Died: 27 February 1945 (aged 29); Ryvangen
- Cause of death: Execution by firing squad
- Resting place: Ryvangen Memorial Park
- Known for: Executed as member of the Danish resistance movement
- Spouse: Ruth Grigorow Binder (married until 1945)
- Parent(s): Gustav Hans Brøndsted and Frederikke Agathe née Stricker
- Website: "Modstandsdatabasen" [Resistance Database]. Karl Gustav Stricker Brøndsted (in Danish). Copenhagen: Nationalmuseet.

Karl Gustav Stricker Brøndsted (13 December 1915 – 27 February 1945) was a member of the Danish resistance executed by the German occupying power.

== Biography ==
On 27 February 1945 Brøndsted and nine other resistance members were executed in Ryvangen.

== After his death ==
After a memorial service in Hellerup church 28 August 1945 Brøndsted was the following day together with 105 other victims of the occupation given a state funeral in the memorial park founded at the execution site in Ryvangen. Bishop Hans Fuglsang-Damgaard led the service with participation from the royal family, the government and representatives of the resistance movement.

The following year his father published the book Derfor blev han Frihedskæmper – Til minde om Karl Gustav Stricker Brøndsted.
