= Christian Ulrik Hansen =

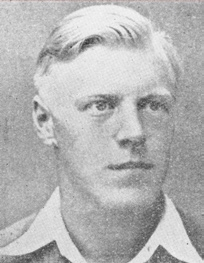
- Christian Ulrik Hansen
- Born: Kristian Ulrik Hansen; 26 May 1921; Vannerup, Farsø
- Died: 23 June 1944 (aged 23); Ryvangen
- Cause of death: Execution by firing squad
- Resting place: Ryvangen Memorial Park
- Occupation: Stud. theol.
- Known for: Executed as member of the Danish resistance movement
- Website: "Modstandsdatabasen" [Resistance Database]. Christian Ulrik Hansen (in Danish). Copenhagen: Nationalmuseet.

Christian Ulrik Hansen (26 May 1921 – 23 June 1944) was a student of theology and member of the Danish resistance executed by the German occupying power.

== Biography ==
On 23 June 1944 Hansen and seven other members of the resistance were executed in Ryvangen.

== After his death ==
The January 1945 issue of the resistance newspaper Frit Danmark (Free Denmark) reported on the execution of the eight resistance members including Hansen.

On 29 August Hansen and 105 other victims of the occupation were given a state funeral in the memorial park founded at the execution site in Ryvangen. Bishop Hans Fuglsang-Damgaard led the service with participation from the royal family, the government and representatives of the resistance movement.
