= Hermann Møller Boye =

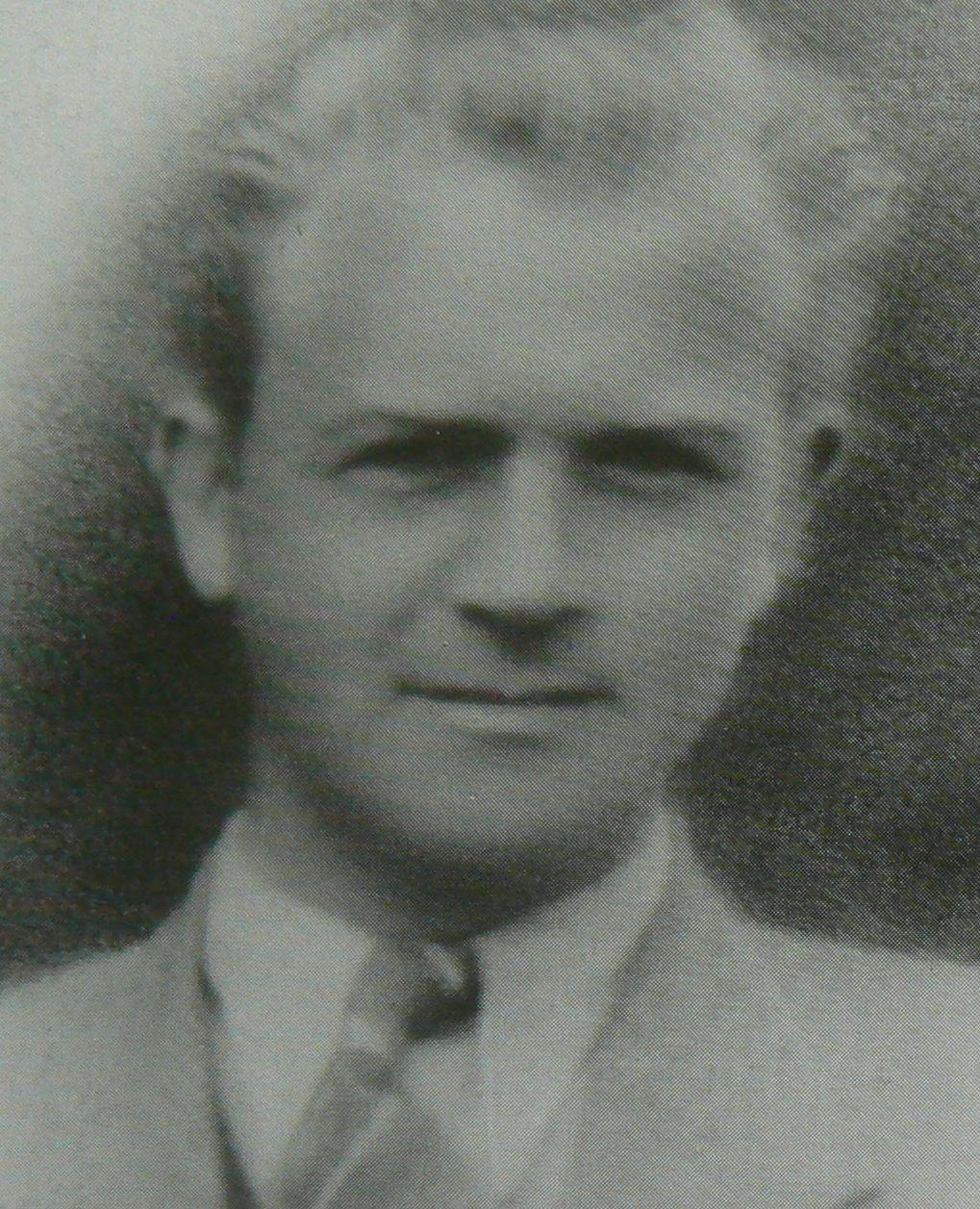
- Hermann Møller Boye
- Born: Herman Møller Boye; 5 July 1913; Rolpested, Marstal
- Died: 12 June 1944 (aged 30); Ryvangen
- Cause of death: Execution by firing squad
- Resting place: Ryvangen Memorial Park
- Occupation: Municipal Teacher
- Known for: Executed as member of the Danish resistance movement
- Parent(s): Herman Møller Boye and Maren née Rasmussen
- Website: "Modstandsdatabasen" [Resistance Database]. Hermann Møller Boye (in Danish). Copenhagen: Nationalmuseet.

Hermann Møller Boye (5 July 1913 – 12 June 1944) was a member of the Danish resistance executed by the German occupying power.

== Biography ==
In 1935 Boye graduated as a teacher from Nørre Nissum Seminarium and from that year he was a teacher.

On June 12, 1944, Boye was executed in Ryvangen by the Gestapo.

== After his death ==
On 29 August 1945 Boye and 105 other victims of the occupation were given a state funeral in the memorial park founded at the execution and burial site in Ryvangen where his remains had been recovered. Bishop Hans Fuglsang-Damgaard led the service with participation from the royal family, the government and representatives of the resistance movement.

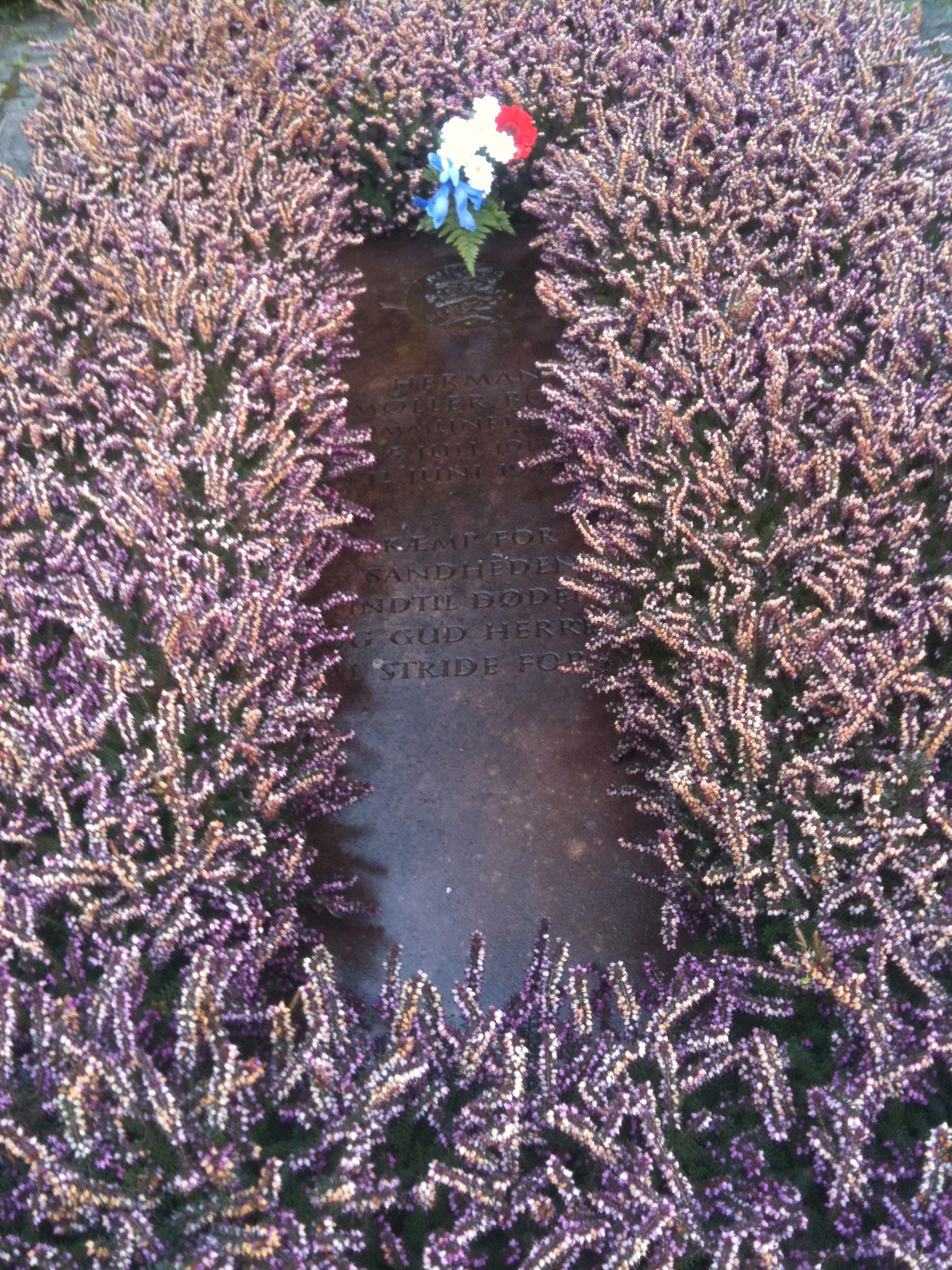
Herman Møller Boye's grave in Ryvangen Memorial Park

A memorial plaque at Nørre Nissum Seminarium where he graduated as a teacher commemorates his sacrifice for Denmark.
