= Kaj Leo Kristensen =

Danish resistance member

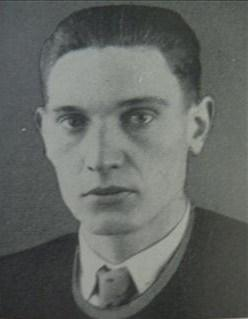
- Kaj Leo Kristensen
- Born: Kaj Leo Kristensen; 7 November 1917; Vråby
- Died: 17 March 1945 (aged 27); Ryvangen
- Cause of death: Execution by firing squad
- Resting place: Ryvangen Memorial Park
- Other names: Leo Christensen
- Occupation: Vulkanisør
- Known for: Executed as member of the Danish resistance movement
- Website: "Modstandsdatabasen" [Resistance Database]. Kaj Leo Kristensen (in Danish). Copenhagen: Nationalmuseet.

Kaj Leo Kristensen (7 November 1917 – 17 March 1945) was a member of the Danish resistance. He was executed by the German occupying power.

== Biography ==
On 26 February 1945, Kristensen and six other members of the Holger Danske resistance group were arrested by the Gestapo in Skindergade 44, Copenhagen. They were all executed in Ryvangen on 17 March.

== After his death ==
On 29 August 1945, Kristensen and 105 other victims of the occupation were given a state funeral in the memorial park founded at the execution and burial site in Ryvangen where his remains had been recovered. Bishop Hans Fuglsang-Damgaard led the service with participation from the royal family, the government, and representatives of the resistance movement.

A memorial stone marks the place of his arrest.
