= Kim Malthe-Bruun =

Danish resistance member

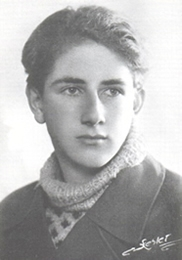
- Born: 8 July 1923; Edmonton, Alberta, Canada
- Died: 6 April 1945 (aged 21); Ryvangen
- Cause of death: Executed
- Resting place: Ryvangen Memorial Park
- Citizenship: Denmark
- Occupation: Seaman
- Known for: Executed as member of the Danish resistance movement
- Website: "Modstandsdatabasen" [Resistance Database]. Kim Malthe-Bruun (in Danish). Copenhagen: Nationalmuseet.

Kim Malthe-Bruun (born Kim Friis-Hansen, 8 July 1923 – 6 April 1945) was a Canadian-born seaman and a member of the Danish resistance, who was executed by the Germans during their occupation of Denmark.

== Biography ==
He was born in Edmonton, Alberta, Canada and baptized in St. George's church. At the age of nine, Kim, his six-year-old sister Ruth, and his mother moved back to Denmark where she was originally from. He grew up a farmhand, but by the time he was seventeen, he had become a merchant seaman. When Nazi Germany invaded Denmark, he joined the Danish resistance movement at the age of 21. He used his skills as a sailor to transport arms for the resistance.

On 19 December 1944, Kim was arrested by the Gestapo in an apartment on Classen Street with two friends. He was unarmed and carrying his own identification papers. He was sent to the Vestre Fængsel Prison soon after his arrest. The first cell he stayed in was Cell 252, in the German Section.

On 15 January 1945 he received royal permission to change his last name to his mother's maiden name, Malthe-Bruun.

On Wednesday, 21 February, Kim was sent to the Police Headquarters for questioning. He did not return to Vestre until Wednesday, 28 February. The next day he was placed in solitary confinement.

In a letter to his girlfriend, he stated the cells he had been in so far:

- 19 December 1944 – 2 February 1945, Cell 252
- 2 February 1945, at 8 o'clock - Cell 585 (he called a "dark cell")
- 7 February - 11 February - Frøslev
- 12 February - 11 March - Cells 286, 284, 282, 276, and 270 (in Vestre Fængsel)
- 1 March - 2 March - Cell 586
- 5 March - 12 March - Cell 50 (Police Headquarters)
- 15 March- ? - Cell 37 (Police Headquarters)

Two days before his execution he wrote her for the last time, urging her to go on with her life:

I don’t expect you to forget me. Why should you forget something so beautiful as that which existed between us? But you mustn’t become a slave to this memory […] Don’t let it blind you and keep you from seeing all the wonderful things life has in store for you. Don’t be unhappy […]

You will live on and you will have other beautiful adventures, but promise me — this you owe to everything I have lived for — that never will the thought of me come between you and life … Gradually as bigger and more important things appear, I shall glide into the background and be a tiny speck of the soil out of which your happiness and your development will keep on growing […]

You see, Hanne, one day you will meet the man who will be your husband. The thought of me will flash through you, and you will perhaps deep down have a vague, uneasy feeling that you are betraying me or something in you which is pure and sacred. Lift up your head once more, Hanne, look straight into my eyes which are smiling at you and you will understand that the only way to betray me is by not completely following your natural instincts. When you see him, let your heart go out to meet him — not to drown your sorrow but because you truly love him.

On 6 April 1945, Kim Malthe-Bruun was executed in Ryvangen.

== After his death ==
On 11 June 1945 Malthe-Bruun's remains were recovered in Ryvangen.

On 29 August Malthe-Bruun and 105 other victims of the occupation were given a state funeral in the memorial park founded at the execution and burial site in Ryvangen where his remains had been recovered. Bishop Hans Fuglsang-Damgaard led the service with participation from the royal family, the government and representatives of the resistance movement.

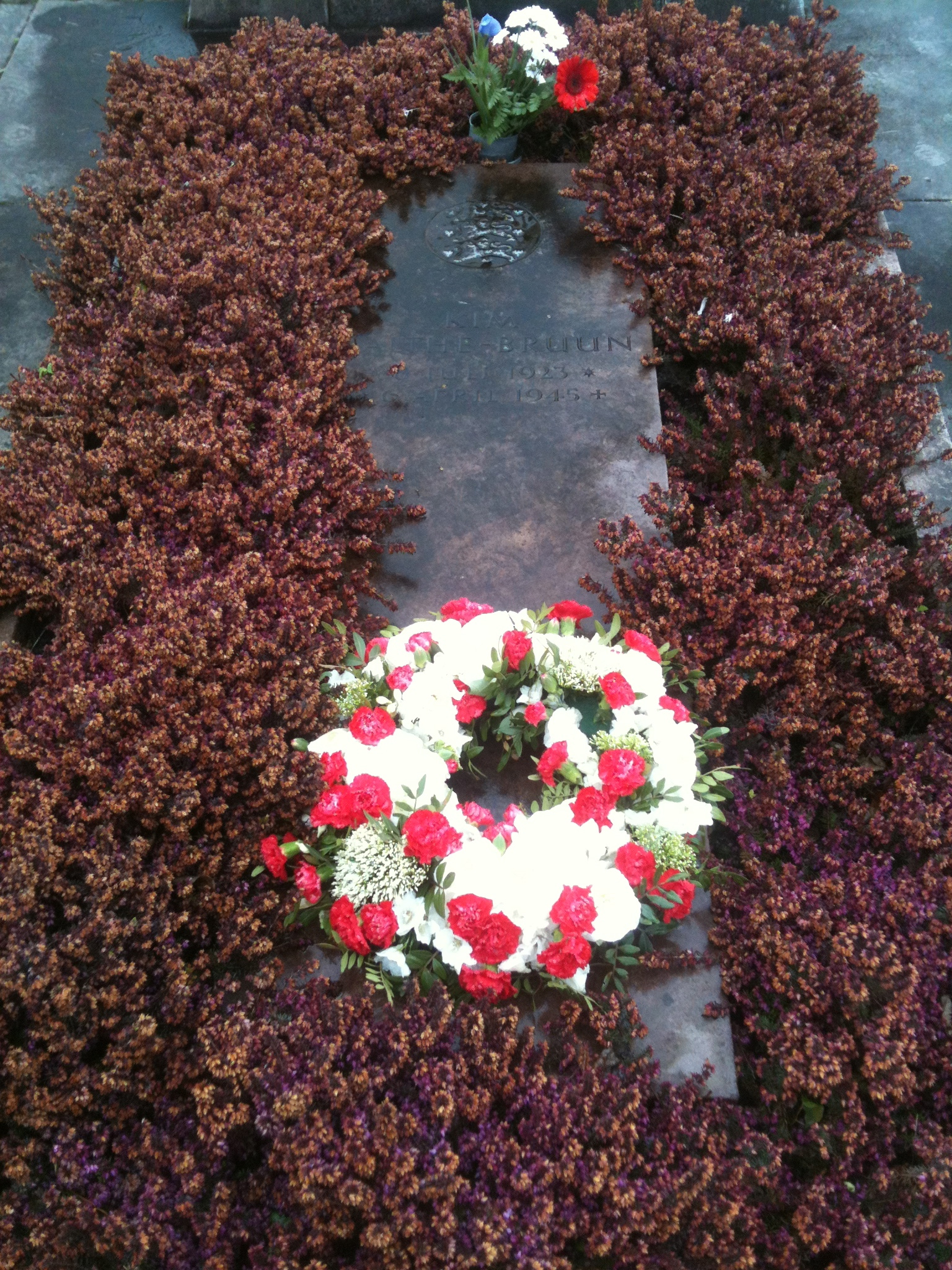
Tomb of Kim Malthe-Bruun in Ryvangen Memorial Park

After the war, his mother published a book about him titled Heroic Heart: The Diary and Letters of Kim Malthe-Bruun. It contains his diary entries and many of his letters home to both her and his girlfriend Hanne.

In the afterword to her work of historical fiction, Number the Stars, Lois Lowry likened the character Peter Neilsen, a resistance member, to Kim, possibly for his courage against the Nazis. She also wrote of Kim "seeing the quiet determination in his boyish eyes made me determined, too, to tell his story, and that of all the Danish people who shared his dreams." She ends the afterword with a quote to his mother from one of his last letters from jail.

A Danish documentary about Kim Malthe-Bruun was made in 2009.
