= Poul Ib Gjessing =

Danish resistance member (1909–1944)

- Born: 31 March 1909; Præstemarken, Silkeborg, Denmark
- Died: 23 June 1944 (aged 35); Ryvangen, Denmark
- Cause of death: Execution by firing squad
- Resting place: Ryvangen Memorial Park
- Occupation: Sea captain
- Known for: Executed as member of the Danish resistance movement
- Spouse: (married)
- Parent(s): Ejnar Gjessing and Ane Dorthea Jørgine Hansen
- Website: "Modstandsdatabasen" [Resistance Database]. Poul Ib Gjessing (in Danish). Copenhagen: Nationalmuseet.

Poul Ib Gjessing (31 March 1909 – 23 June 1944) was a Danish sea captain and member of the Danish resistance executed by the German occupying power.

== Biography ==
In March 1944 the Gestapo made an "incredible number of arrests" including ten arrests in the region of Års. The presumed leader of the Års group was the 35-year-old sea Captain Gjessing, who was found to have in his Hasseris home a large weapons cache and about 50 fake police badges.

On 23 June 1944, Gjessing and seven other members of the resistance were executed in Ryvangen.

== After his death ==
The January 1945 issue of the resistance newspaper Frit Danmark (Free Denmark) reported on the execution of the eight resistance members including Gjessing.

On 29 August 1945 Gjessing and 105 other victims of the occupation were given a state funeral in the memorial park founded at the execution site in Ryvangen. Bishop Hans Fuglsang-Damgaard led the service with participation from the royal family, the government and representatives of the resistance movement.
