= Harald Christensen =

Harald Christensen may refer to:

- Harald Christensen (cyclist) (1907–1994), Danish olympic cyclist.
- Harald Christensen (resistance member) (1915–1945), Danish resistance member executed in 1945
- Harald Christensen (wrestler), Danish 1907 World Wrestling Champion.
