= Georg Quistgaard =

Danish resistance member (1915–1944)

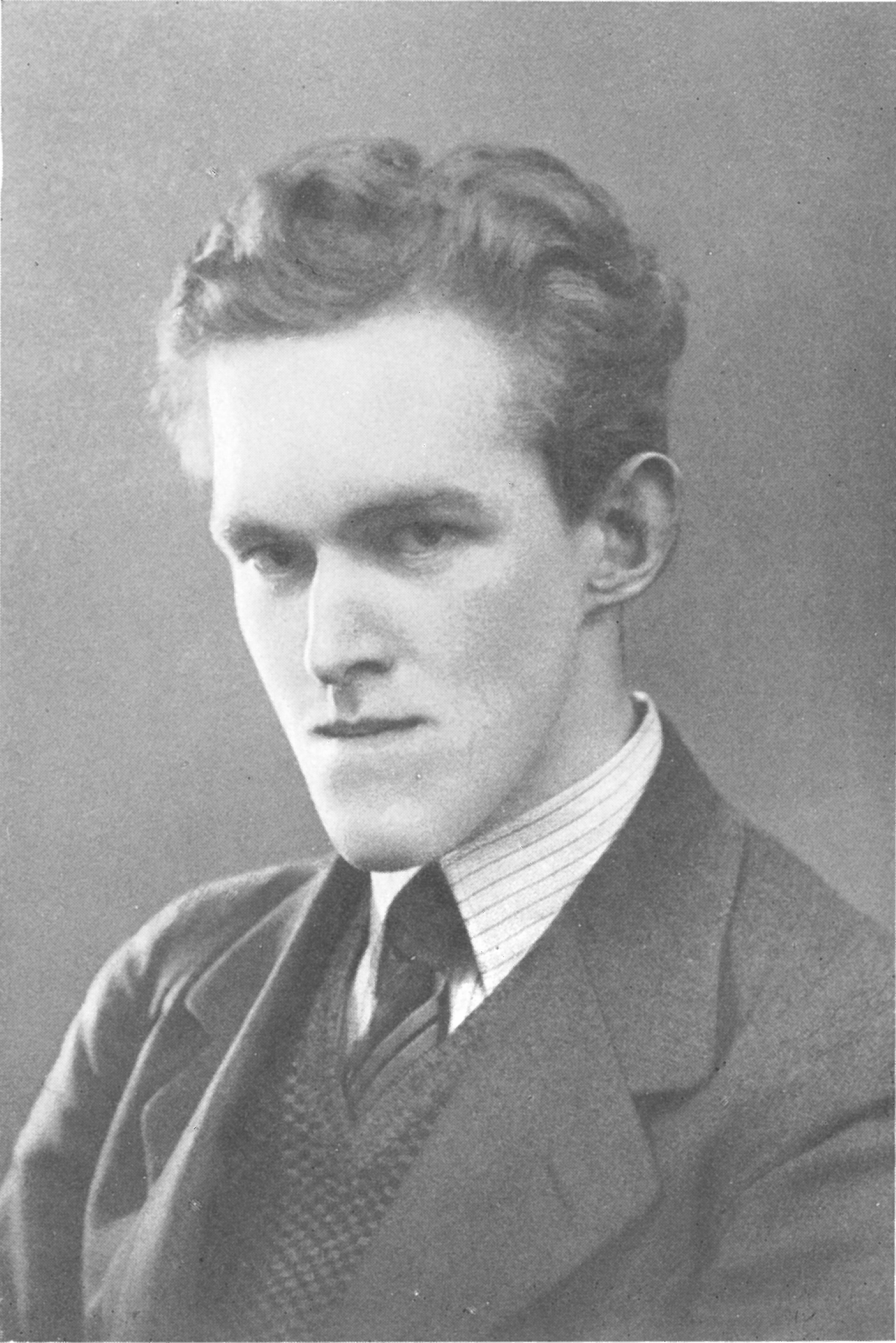
- Georg Brockhoff Quistgaard
- Born: Georg Brockhoff Quistgaard; 19 February 1915
- Died: 20 or 21 May 1944 (aged 29); Ryvangen
- Cause of death: Execution by firing squad,
- Resting place: Ryvangen Memorial Park
- Occupations: Art Dealer, Translator, Writer
- Known for: Executed as member of the Danish resistance movement
- Spouse: Ellen Johanne Nielsen (married 1938 - 1944)
- Parent(s): Georg Brockhoff Quistgaard and Marie Bolette née Breyen
- Website: "Modstandsdatabasen" [Resistance Database]. Georg Brockhoff Quistgaard (in Danish). Copenhagen: Nationalmuseet.

Signature
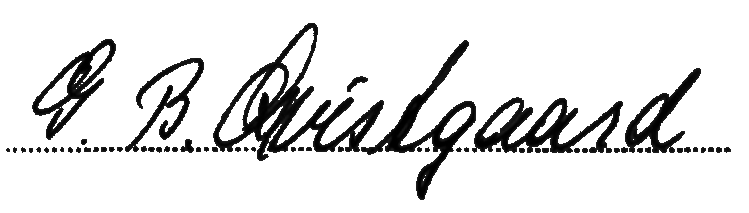

Georg Quistgaard (19 February 1915 - 20 or 21 May 1944) was one of 102 members of the Danish resistance to the German occupation of Denmark in World War II who were executed following a court-martial.

== Biography ==
As a youth, Quistgaard dropped out of high-school and travelled through Europe on foot and bicycle. In Paris, he met the two year younger Ellen Nielsen and they returned to Denmark.

They married and opened a small shop of art works in Copenhagen, which went out of business in 1940.

== Resistance ==
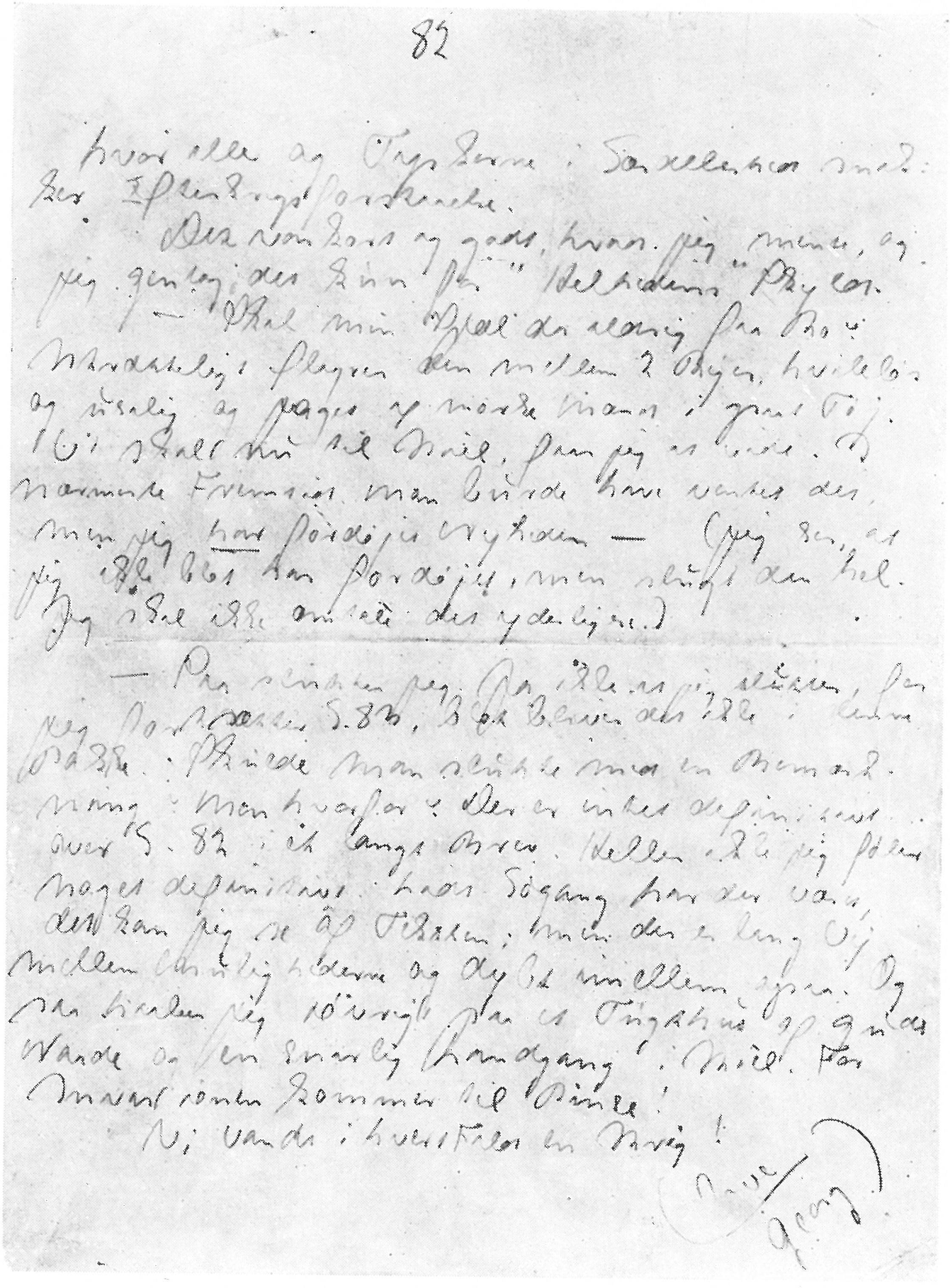
The last page of his diary

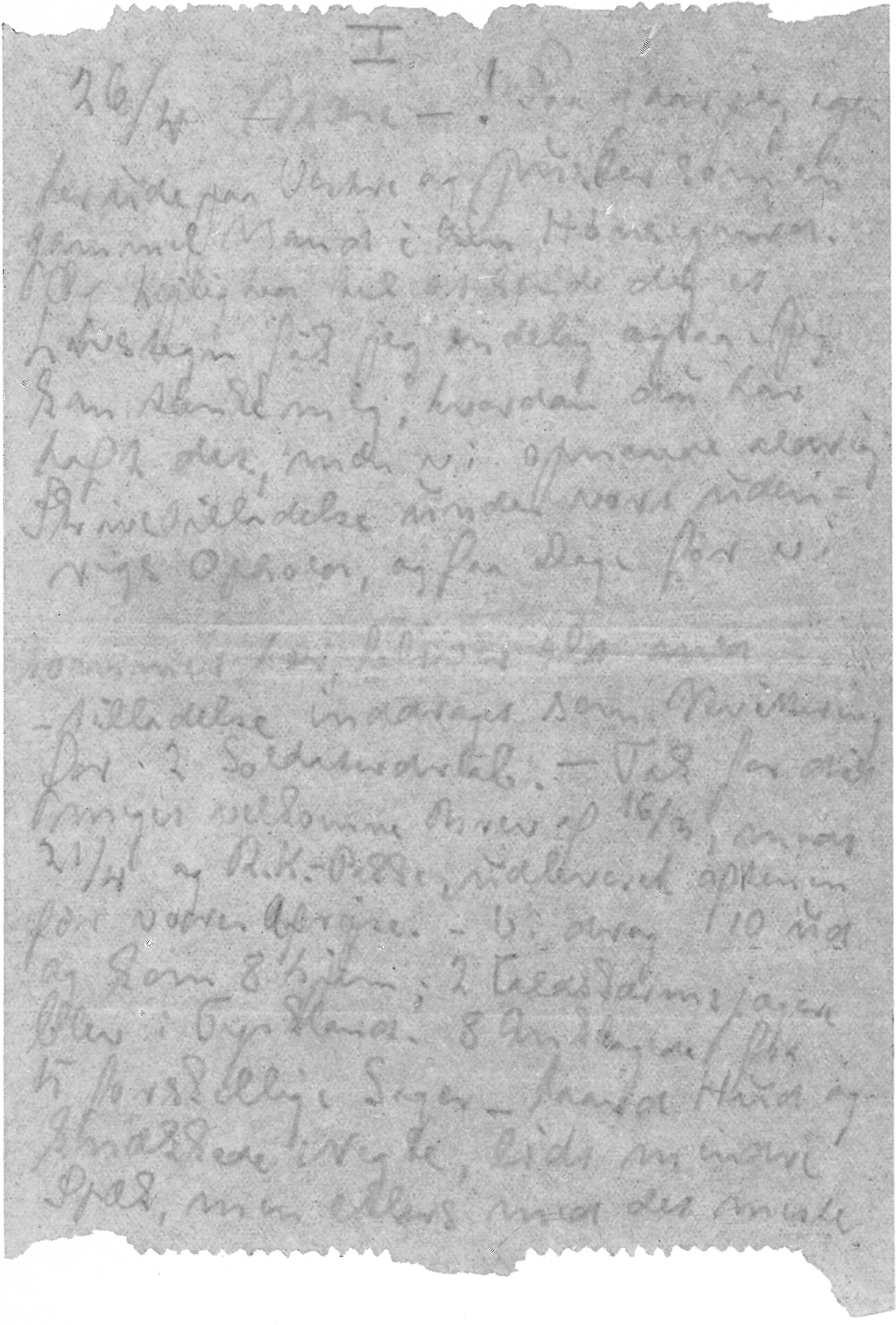
The first part of a letter to this mother, written on toilet paper

During the occupation of Denmark, Quistgaard was connected to "Hjemmefronten" (the home front) og Special Operations Executive for whom he was a contact person and courier. He scouted for new airdrop sites, helped found the Hvidsten group as well as participating in their initial airdrop receptions.

Additionally Quistgaard participated in the reception of allied airdropped weapons in the area of Gyldenløves Høj.

On 13 January 1944 the Gestapo arrested Quistgaard in his home (Abenraa 10, Copenhagen) after an exchange of fire; they incarcerated him in Vestre Fængsel. His wife was not at home and managed to escape to Sweden, a fact which the resistance later communicated to Quistgaard.

The January 1944 issue of De frie Danske describes a drawn out firefight around 3 pm in the Copenhagen street Aabenraa between the Gestapo and Danish patriots. The newspaper learned that five people were arrested in a building there, after they ran out of ammunition.

On 28 January 1944 the Gestapo arrested Quistgaard's mother. The interrogation by the Gestapo took place at their headquarters in Dagmarhus. Quistgaard's prison diary and letters to his wife and mother suggest that he did not feel he was subjected to torture, but rather that there was some element of mutual respect between him and his interrogators. Quistgaard's initial interrogation included sleep deprivation, including one 28-hour interrogation, and thinly veiled threats of being beaten with a rubber baton.

His mother was released after about two weeks of imprisonment.

On 2 March 1944 Quistgaard was moved with eight others to Schwerin.

On 25 April 1944 he was transferred back to Vestre Fængsel.

On 12 May 1944 Quistgaard was put on trial as one of twelve members of the resistance in front of three judges from the SS. As witnesses, the prosecution presented two SOE operatives, known as Jacob Jensen and Bent. The former incriminated eight of the twelve to the point where they admitted to the charges. Quistgaard along with two other men and Monica Wichfeld were condemned to death with the execution pending any new acts of sabotage. Two days later the four death sentences were published in the Danish newspapers.

On the evening of 20 May 1944 Quistgaard wrote what was to be his last letter, to his mother. It was smuggled out the following day by Jørgen Kieler.

On 20 or 21 May 1944 Quistgaard and the two other men condemned at the trial were executed. Monica Wichfeld had her sentence commuted to life imprisonment but died in German captivity before the end of the war. The news of the execution was published by the papers on 23 May.

== After his death ==
On 26 June a memorial service was held for Quistgaard in Grundtvig's Church and on 29 August he and 105 other victims of the occupation were given a state funeral in the memorial park founded at the execution site in Ryvangen. Bishop Hans Fuglsang-Damgaard led the service with participation from the royal family, the government and representatives of the resistance movement.

In 1946 his prison diary and letters were published, prefaced by Elias Bredsdorff. The royalties from the book were donated to Frihedsfonden.

== Legacy and honors ==
- Together with Erik Briand Clausen and two other resistance members who fell victim to the German occupation Quistgaard is commemorated with a memorial stone on Gyldenløves Høj.

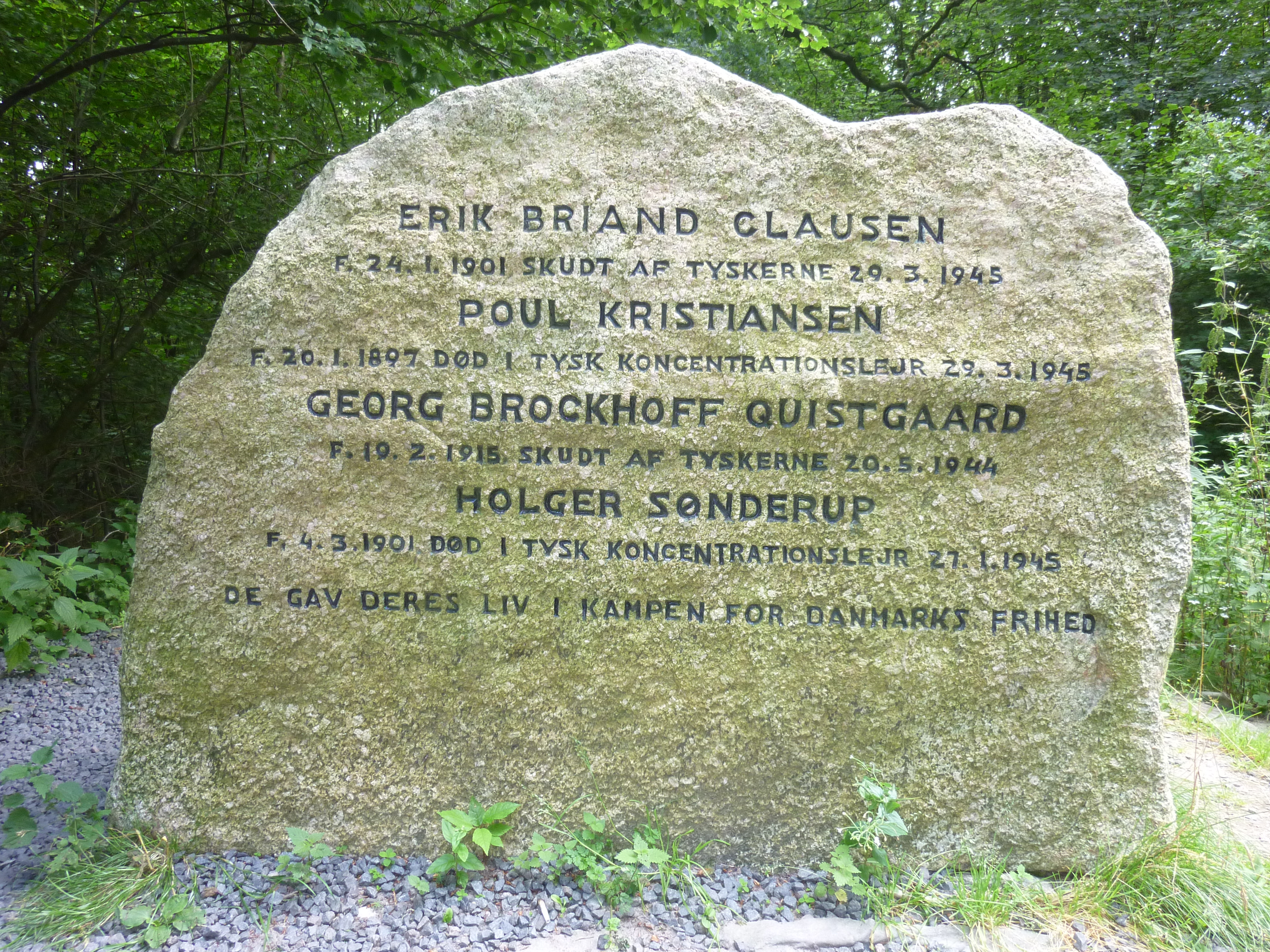
The memorial stone on Gyldenløves Høj

== Bibliography ==
- Quistgaard, Georg (1944). Fængselsdagbog og breve [Prison Diary and Letters] (in Danish). Prefaced by Elias Bredsdorff. Copenhagen: Nyt Nordisk Forlag, Arnold Busck (published 1946). 101 pages.
