= Harald Christensen (resistance member) =

Danish resistance member (1915–1945)

- Born: 28 May 1915; Vestergade 29, Fåborg
- Died: 27 February 1945 (aged 29)
- Cause of death: Execution by firing squad
- Resting place: Ryvangen Memorial Park (until 1950)
- Occupation: Auto mechanic
- Known for: Executed as member of the Danish resistance movement
- Parent(s): Niels Christensen and Maren Christine née Madsen
- Website: "Modstandsdatabasen" [Resistance Database]. Harald Christensen (in Danish). Copenhagen: Nationalmuseet.

Harald Christensen (28 May 1915 – 27 February 1945) was a member of the Danish resistance executed by the German occupying power.

== Biography ==
Harald Christensen was born in Faaborg 28 May 1915 as the eighth child of factory worker Niels Christensen and wife Maren Christine née Madsen and baptized in Faaborg church the seventh Sunday after Trinity.

In 1916 Christensen was living with his parents and siblings in Vestergade 29, Fåborg with his father supporting the family as a worker at Fåborg's wood wool factory with a permanently injured knee.

On 27 February 1945 Christensen and nine other resistance members were executed in Ryvangen.

== After his death ==
On 30 June 1945 at Vestre Kirkegaard a memorial service was held for him, as well as for the killed member of the resistance Estvan Svend Aage Wehlast.

On 29 August Christensen and 105 other victims of the occupation were given a state funeral in the memorial park founded at the execution and burial site in Ryvangen where he was executed. Bishop Hans Fuglsang-Damgaard led the service with participation from the royal family, the government and representatives of the resistance movement.

In 1950 his remains were moved, prior to the official inauguration of the Ryvangen Memorial Park on 5 May 1950. Remarkably, a second resistance member to also be removed from the memorial park was the above-mentioned Estvan Svend Aage Wehlast.

The official list of resistance members buried in Ryvangen does not include Christensen, nor Wehlast.
