= Erik Crone (resistance member) =

Danish resistance member (1919–1945)

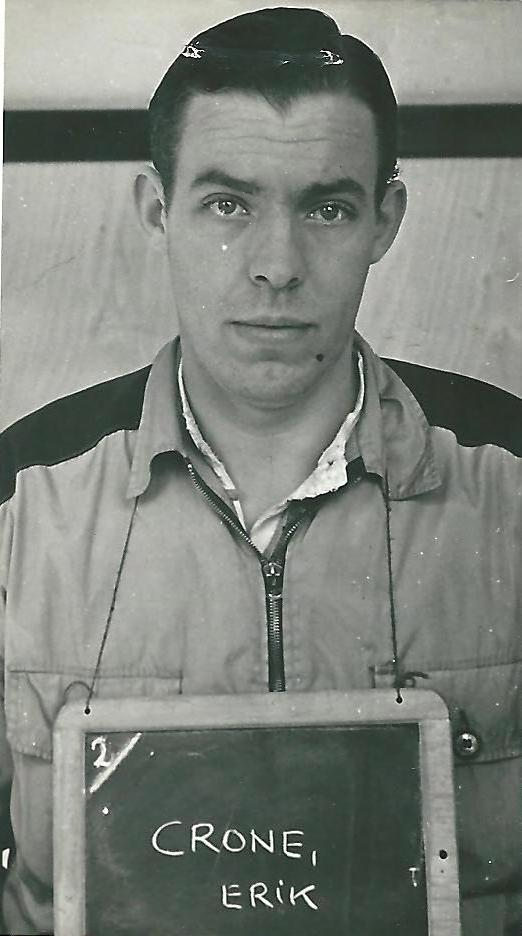
- Erik Crone in custody
- Born: 29 May 1919; Aarhus
- Died: 27 February 1945 (aged 25)
- Cause of death: Execution by firing squad
- Resting place: Ryvangen Memorial Park
- Occupation: Stud.polit.
- Known for: Executed as member of the Danish resistance movement
- Website: "Modstandsdatabasen" [Resistance Database]. Erik Crone (in Danish). Copenhagen: Nationalmuseet.

Erik Crone (29 May 1919 – 27 February 1945) was a member of the Danish resistance executed by the German occupying power.

== Biography ==
Crone's membership of the resistance was betrayed to Gestapo by Jørgen Børge Axel Lorenzen, leader of the infamous Lorenzen Group and on 19 December 1944 Crone was arrested.

On 27 February 1945 Crone and nine other resistance members were executed in Ryvangen.

== After his death ==
On 29 August Crone and 105 other victims of the occupation were given a state funeral in the memorial park founded at the execution and burial site in Ryvangen where he was executed. Bishop Hans Fuglsang-Damgaard led the service with participation from the royal family, the government and representatives of the resistance movement.

Erik Crone is named with 24 others who died in the resistance on a memorial plaque at the Frue Plads gate of the University of Copenhagen.
