= Ebbe Rørdam =

Danish resistance member

- Born: 10 January 1925; Hvilsager
- Died: 16 March 1945 (aged 20); Denmark (unknown)
- Cause of death: Skull fracture
- Resting place: Ryvangen Memorial Park
- Occupation: Officer trainee
- Known for: Killed as member of the Danish resistance movement
- Website: "Modstandsdatabasen" [Resistance Database]. Ebbe Rørdam (in Danish). Copenhagen: Nationalmuseet.

Ebbe Rørdam (10 January 1925 – 16 March 1945) was a member of the Danish resistance killed by the German occupying power.

== Biography ==
On 16 March 1945, Rørdam died in connection with the sabotage of an ammunition train.

== After his death ==
On 29 August, Rørdam and 105 other victims of the occupation were given a state funeral in the memorial park founded at the execution and burial site in Ryvangen where his remains had been recovered. Bishop Hans Fuglsang-Damgaard led the service with participation from the royal family, the government and representatives of the resistance movement.
