= Emil Balslev =

- Born: Emil Balslev; 19 September 1913; Rahbeksalle 22, Frederiksberg
- Died: 23 June 1944 (aged 30); Ryvangen
- Cause of death: Execution by firing squad
- Resting place: Ryvangen Memorial Park
- Occupation: Surveyor
- Known for: Executed as member of the Danish resistance movement
- Parent(s): Viggo Balslev and Nanna Elisabeth née Lyngby
- Website: "Modstandsdatabasen" [Resistance Database]. Emil Balslev (in Danish). Copenhagen: Nationalmuseet.

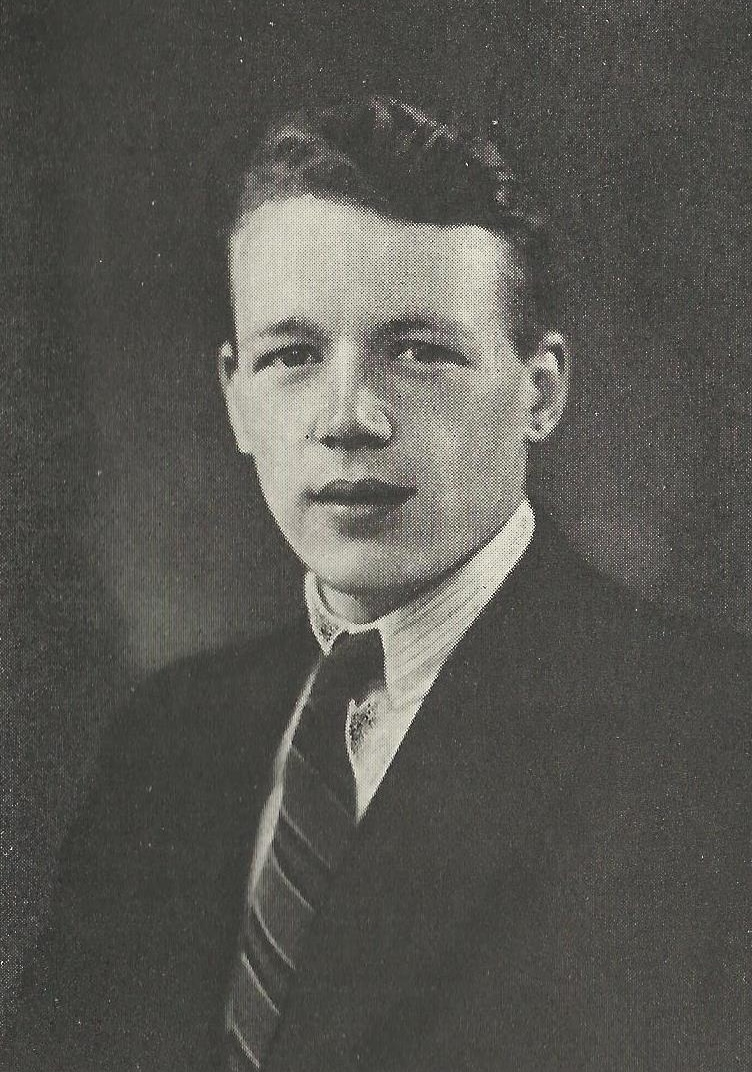
Emil Balslev

Emil Balslev (19 September 1913 – 23 June 1944) was a member of the Danish resistance executed by the German occupying power.

== Biography ==
In March 1944 the Gestapo made an "incredible number of arrests" including ten arrests in the region of Års, among these Balslev.

On 23 June 1944 Balslev and seven other members of the resistance were executed in Ryvangen.

== After his death ==
The January 1945 issue of the resistance newspaper Frit Danmark (Free Denmark) reported on the execution of the eight resistance members including Balslev.

On 29 August 1945 Balslev and 105 other victims of the occupation were given a state funeral in the memorial park founded at the execution site in Ryvangen. Bishop Hans Fuglsang-Damgaard led the service with participation from the royal family, the government and representatives of the resistance movement.
