= Jørgen Arboe-Rasmussen =

Danish resistance member (1925–1945)

- Born: Jørgen Arboe-Rasmussen; 5 March 1925; Amager Fælledvej 7-4th, Copenhagen
- Died: 5 Nyelandsvej Lazaret, Frederiksberg Hospital
- Cause of death: Gunshot wounds
- Resting place: Ryvangen Memorial Park
- Occupation: Journalist
- Known for: Killed as member of the Danish resistance movement
- Parent(s): Erik Arboe-Rasmussen and Alma Louise Amanda née Hansen Fossing
- Website: "Modstandsdatabasen" [Resistance Database]. Jørgen Arboe-Rasmussen (in Danish). Copenhagen: Nationalmuseet.

Jørgen Arboe-Rasmussen (5 March 1925 – 5 or 6 February 1945) was a member of the Danish resistance killed by the German occupying power.

== Biography ==
On 5 February 1945 Arboe-Rasmussen was gunned down in Café Brønnum near Kongens Nytorv. He was brought to the German medical clinic at Nyelandsvej where he died of his wounds the same day.

== After his death ==
On 29 August 1945 Arboe-Rasmussen and 105 other victims of the occupation were given a state funeral in the memorial park founded at the execution and burial site in Ryvangen where his remains had been recovered. Bishop Hans Fuglsang-Damgaard led the service with participation from the royal family, the government and representatives of the resistance movement.

A memorial plaque at August Bournonvilles Passage 1 commemorates his sacrifice for Denmark.

Every year on 5 February the Danish Union of Journalists awards the memorial grant Jørgen Arboe Rasmussens Mindelegat to a journalist trainee at a provincial newspaper.
