= Peter Bogstad Mandel =

Danish resistance member (1924–1945)

Peter Bogstad Mandel (9 May 1924 – 25 February 1945) was a member of the Danish resistance killed by the German occupying power.

== Biography ==
On 25 February 1945 Mandel died of his wounds in the German medical clinic at Nyelandsvej, Frederiksberg Hospital.

== After his death ==
On 29 August 1945 Mandel and 105 other victims of the occupation were given a state funeral in the memorial park founded at the execution and burial site in Ryvangen where his remains had been recovered. Bishop Hans Fuglsang-Damgaard led the service with participation from the royal family, the government and representatives of the resistance movement.

Peter Bogstad Mandel is named on memorial plaques at three schools on Frederiksberg.
