= Erik Briand Clausen =

Danish resistance member

- Born: 24 January 1901; Japan
- Died: 29 March 1945 (aged 44); Ryvangen
- Cause of death: Execution by firing squad
- Resting place: Bispebjerg Cemetery
- Occupation: Farmer
- Known for: Executed as member of the Danish resistance movement
- Spouse: (married)
- Website: "Modstandsdatabasen" [Resistance Database]. Erik Briand Clausen (in Danish). Copenhagen: Nationalmuseet.

Erik Briand Clausen (24 January 1901 – 29 March 1945) was a farmer and member of the Danish resistance executed by the German occupying power.

As a member of the resistance Clausen participated in the reception of allied airdropped weapons in the area of Gyldenløves Høj.

After the liberation Clausen's remains were exhumed at Ryvangen and transferred to the Department of Forensic Medicine of the university of Copenhagen and on 3 August 1945 reburied at Bispebjerg Cemetery.

Together with Georg Quistgaard and two other resistance members who fell victim to the German occupation Clausen is commemorated with a memorial stone on Gyldenløves Høj.

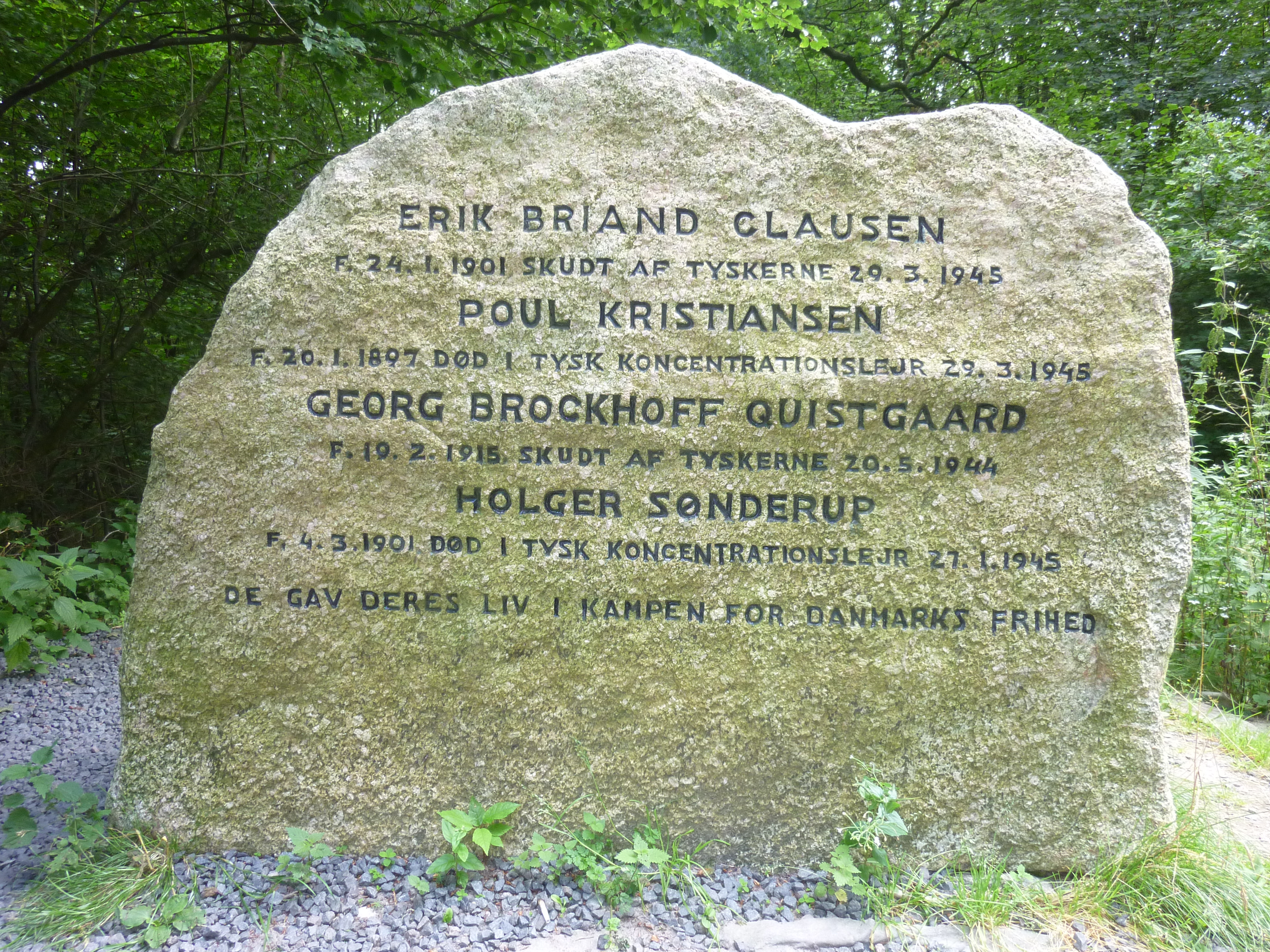
The memorial stone on Gyldenløves Høj
