= Lone Maslocha =

Danish photographer and resistance fighter

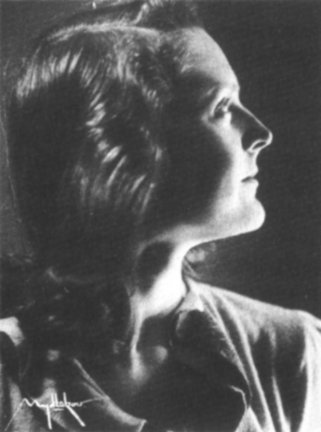
Lone Maslocha

Anna Louise Christine "Lone" Maslocha, also Masłocha, née Mogensen (26 October 1921 – 3 January 1945) was a Polish-born Danish photographer who became a resistance fighter during the German occupation of Denmark in World War II. She was associated with the Polish-English intelligence service and with the Danish resistance movement Holger Danske and worked for the prominent Danish resistance member Citronen.

She was shot by the Gestapo together with her Polish husband Lucjan Masłocha on the night of 2 to 3 January, shortly after they had married on New Year's Eve. Lone died on the spot, while her husband died eight days later in the German hospital on Nyelandsvej.

== Early life and education ==
Born on 26 October 1921 in Klucze, Poland, Anna Louise Christine Mogensen was the daughter of the Danish engineer Knud Mogensen (1881–1943) and his wife Louise (née Friis). The youngest of three children, she was raised in Poland where her father was an employee of the Danish cement firm FLSmidth. As a result of disturbing developments in Poland, the family returned to Denmark, where she attended Snoghøj Gymnastikhøjskole before being trained as a photographer by Rigmor Mydtskov.

== Participation in the resistance movement ==
From the autumn of 1939, together with the other members of her family, Lone Mogensen took up contact with the Polish emigration authorities in order to assist the Polish refugees who travelled to Denmark after the German invasion of Poland. As a keen member of the Conservative's youth movement, together with her two brothers she became involved in the resistance, contributing to the clandestine journals Studenternes Efterretningstjeneste (from 1942) and Hjemmefronten (1943). She took photographs for the renowned resistance fighter Jørgen Haagen Schmith of the Holger Danske group, better known by his codename Citronen. Her involvement brought her into contact with her husband-to-be, Lieutenant Lucjan Masłocha, who from autumn 1943 headed the Polish resistance in Denmark, maintaining ties both with London and Poland. Together they worked in espionage, radio telegraphy and as couriers between Denmark and Sweden. When she was in Sweden, she also used the names Inge Sørensen, Inga Söndergaard and Maja Matjeka.

The couple moved together to a house on Hans Jensensvej in Gentofte, just north of Copenhagen, escaping arrest when the Polish resistance network was discovered by the Germans in spring 1944. They continued to collaborate with the Danish members of Studenternes Efterretningstjeneste.

On New Year's Eve 1944, they were secretly married in Copenhagen's Roman Catholic St. Ansgar's Church. Their marriage lasted only two days as during the night of 2 to 3 January 1945, they were discovered in a locked room by a Gestapo patrol at around 1.30 am, while hiding in the house at 44 Hans Jensensvej. The patrol leader shot through the door with his machine pistol, killing Lone Maslocha on the spot and wounding her husband who died eight days later (stories vary). Both are buried at the Ryvangen Memorial Park, Denmark. Lucjan Masłocha is the only foreigner buried there.

== Commemoration ==
At a ceremony held at Copenhagen's Mindelunden Cemetery on 9 November 2013, Professor Palle Roslyng-Jensen of Copenhagen University delivered a speech in which he told of Lucjan and Lone Masłocha's death and their involvement in the Polish resistance movement in Denmark. He explained that Lucjan Masłocha was the only foreigner buried at the Mindelunden Cemetery and his wife Lone Mogensen, the only woman.

== Decorations ==
- 1945: Silver Cross of the Order of Virtuti Militari (no. 11 131) posthumously
