= Jørgen Rydder =

Danish resistance member (1923–1944)

- Born: 20 September 1923; Års
- Died: 23 June 1944 (aged 20); Ryvangen
- Cause of death: Execution by firing squad, four shots in the chest<
- Resting place: Års cemetery
- Other name: Jørgen Ryder
- Occupations: Warehouse assistant, Merchant
- Known for: Executed as member of the Danish resistance movement
- Website: "Modstandsdatabasen" [Resistance Database]. Jørgen Rydder (in Danish). Copenhagen: Nationalmuseet.

Jørgen Rydder (20 September 1923 – 23 June 1944) was a merchant and member of the Danish resistance executed by the German occupying power.

== Biography ==
On 23 June 1944 Rydder and seven other members of the resistance were executed in Ryvangen.

== After his death ==
The January 1945 issue of the resistance newspaper Frit Danmark (Free Denmark) reported on the execution of the eight resistance members including Rydder.

On 22 June 1945 the remains of Rydder were found in Ryvangen. On 26 June 1945 Rydder as well as Børge Johannes Lauritsen, who was executed with him and like him born in Års, were buried in their home town.

A memorial stone for Rydder and 90 other resistance members also exhumed in Ryvangen and buried in their respective home towns were laid down in Ryvangen Memorial Park.

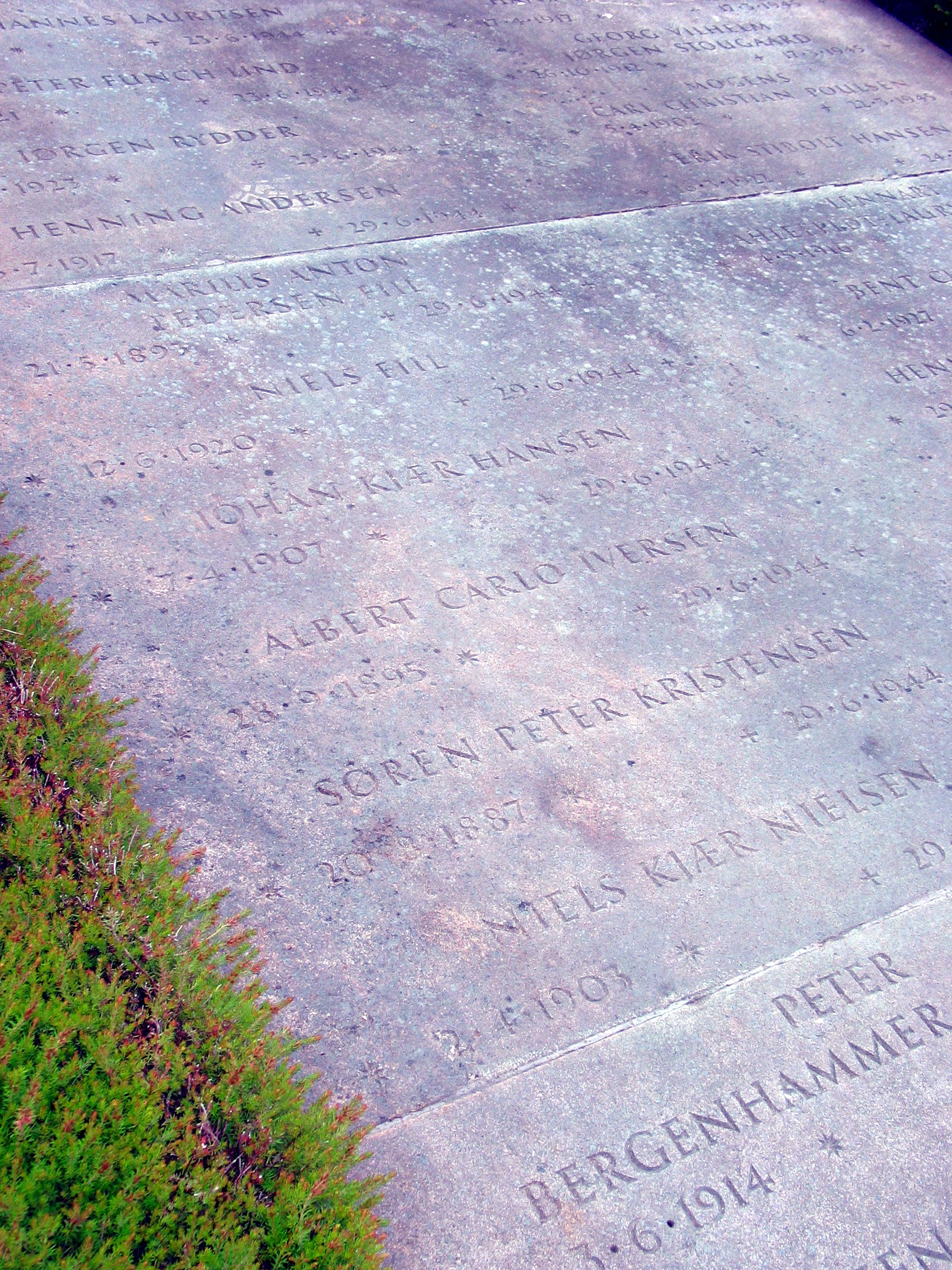
Memorial stone in Ryvangen for resistance members including Rydder
