= Børge Johannes Lauritsen =

Danish resistance member

- Born: 22 October 1916; Års
- Died: 23 June 1944 (aged 27); Ryvangen
- Cause of death: Execution by firing squad, three shots in the chest
- Resting place: Års cemetery
- Occupation: Merchant
- Known for: Executed as member of the Danish resistance movement
- Website: "Modstandsdatabasen" [Resistance Database]. Børge Johannes Lauritsen (in Danish). Copenhagen: Nationalmuseet.

Børge Johannes Lauritsen (22 October 1916 – 23 June 1944) was a merchant and member of the Danish resistance executed by the German occupying power.

== Biography ==
On 23 June 1944 Lauritsen and seven other members of the resistance were executed in Ryvangen

== After his death ==
The January 1945 issue of the resistance newspaper Frit Danmark (Free Denmark) reported on the execution of the eight resistance members including Lauritsen.

On 26 June 1945 Lauritsen as well as Jørgen Rydder, who was executed with him and like him born in Års, were buried in their home town.

A memorial stone for Lauritsen and 90 other resistance members also exhumed in Ryvangen and buried in their respective home towns was laid down in Ryvangen Memorial Park.

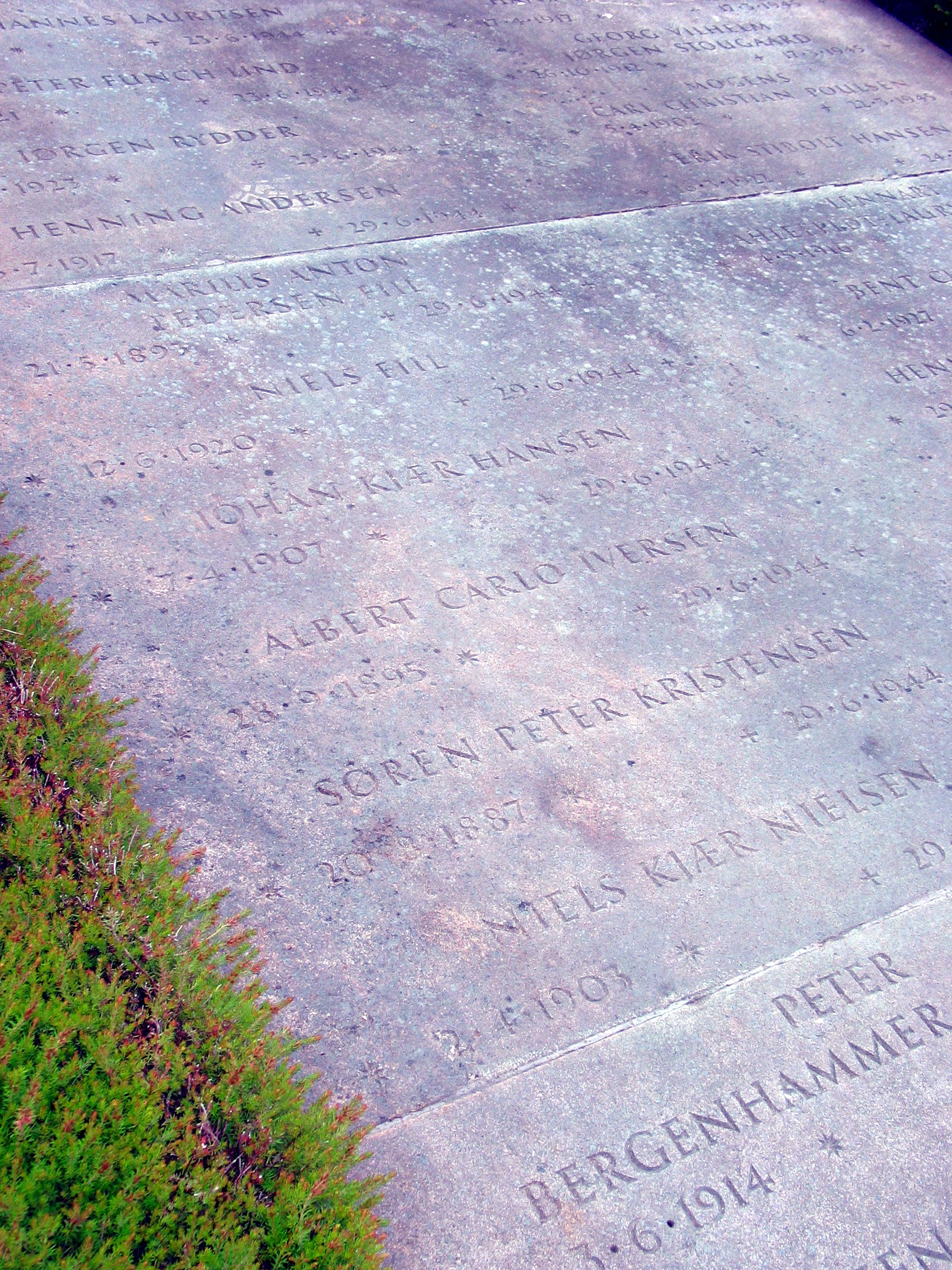
Memorial stone in Ryvangen for resistance members including Lauritsen
