= Andreas Bronislaw Wadeksloff Nielsen =

Danish resistance member (1918–1945)

Andreas Bronislaw Wadeksloff Nielsen (31 March 1918 – 27 February 1945) was a member of the Danish resistance executed by the German occupying power.

== Biography ==
On 19 February 1939 he married Ingrid Kathrine Jensen. As a member of the resistance he was a mechanic and a driver.

On 26 February 1945 a German court martial sentenced Nielsen to death and the following day he and nine other resistance members were executed in Ryvangen.

== After his death ==
On 29 August 1945 Nielsen and 105 other victims of the occupation were given a state funeral in the memorial park founded at the execution and burial site in Ryvangen where he was executed. Bishop Hans Fuglsang-Damgaard led the service with participation from the royal family, the government and representatives of the resistance movement.

The cemetery in Rødovre has a memorial plaque for him.
