= Estvan Svend Aage Wehlast =

Danish resistance fighter

- Born: 15 April 1916; Læssøgade 10-I, Copenhagen
- Died: 9 February 1945 (aged 28)
- Cause of death: Killed while resisting arrest
- Resting place: Ryvangen Memorial Park, from 1946 Brønshøj cemetery
- Other names: Eswan Wehlast
- Occupation: Construction worker
- Known for: Killed while resisting arrest as member of the Danish resistance movement
- Website: "Modstandsdatabasen" [Resistance Database]. Eswan Wehlast (in Danish). Copenhagen: Nationalmuseet.

Estvan Svend Aage Wehlast (15 April 1916 – 9 February 1945) was a member of the Danish resistance killed by Gestapo while resisting arrest.

== Biography ==
On 9 February 1945 Gestapo attempted to arrest Wehlast and his six years younger brother Egon Frants Albert Wehlast at Smørumvej 60 where they kept a duplicating machine. Wehlast resisted the arrest and was shot and killed, while his brother was interned in Frøslev Prison Camp.

== After his death ==
On 29 August Wehlast and 105 other victims of the occupation were given a state funeral in the memorial park founded at the execution and burial site in Ryvangen where their remains had been exhumed. Bishop Hans Fuglsang-Damgaard led the service with participation from the royal family, the government and representatives of the resistance movement.

Soon after the funeral the authorities received information that not only had Wehlast contributed very little to the resistance, but also that he and his brother had committed a series of crimes including robbery, and there were demands to remove his remains from the memorial park. Thus on 3 May 1946, one day prior to the first anniversary of the liberation, Wehlast was exhumed a second time, after his father had agreed to pay for his funeral at the local Brønshøj cemetery.

The official list of resistance members buried in Ryvangen does not include Wehlast.
