= Preben Gylche =

Danish resistance member (1927–1945)

Preben Gylche (30 January 1927 – 27 February 1945) was a member of the Danish resistance executed by the German occupying power. He was the son of Karl Paul Kristian Gylche.

== Biography ==
On 19 September 1944 the German occupation force began their deportation of the Danish police including Gylche's 54-year-old father who within two months died in Buchenwald concentration camp. This undoubtedly influenced Gylche's decision to engage in active resistance.

Gylche was wounded in a firefight and arrested by the Gestapo on 8 February 1945 and a court martial subsequently sentenced him to death.

On 27 February 1945 Gylche and nine other resistance members were executed in Ryvangen.

== After his death ==
On 29 August Gylche and 105 other victims of the occupation were given a state funeral in the memorial park founded at the execution and burial site in Ryvangen where he was executed. Bishop Hans Fuglsang-Damgaard led the service with participation from the royal family, the government and representatives of the resistance movement.

Preben Gylche is named with four others who died in the resistance on a memorial plaque at one at school at Duevej 63, Frederiksberg and with six others at another school at Julius Thomsensgade 5, Frederiksberg.
