= Gyldenløves Høj =

Coordinates: 55.548664°N 11.856317°E

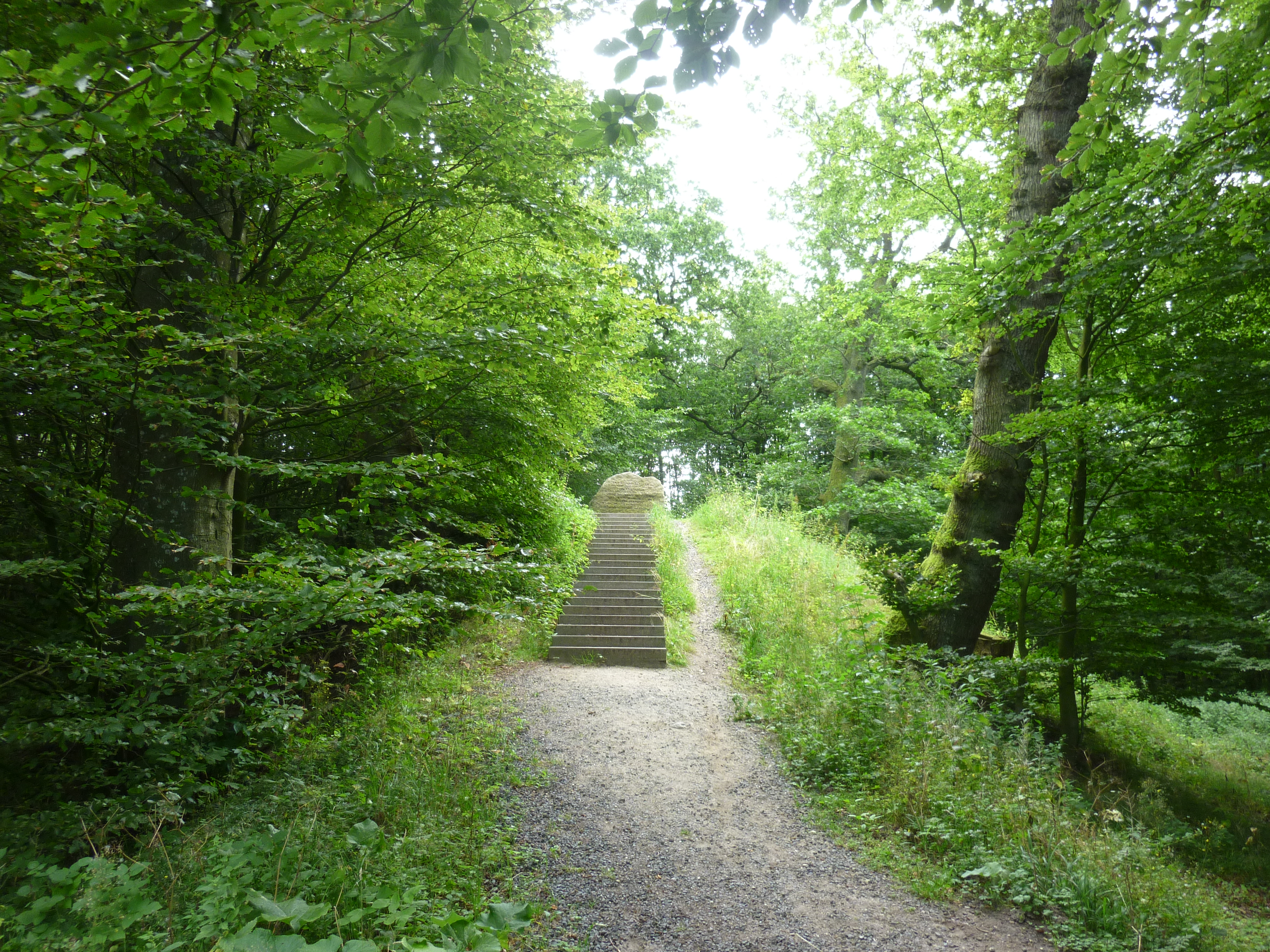
The upper part of Gyldenløves Høj with the steps leading up to the memorial stone

Gyldenløves Høj is a high point on Sjælland, used to be the highest at 125.5 m above mean sea level. Kobanke near Rønnede is the highest natural point, however, at 122.9 m, as Gyldenløves Høj is only 121.3 m without the artificial mound constructed at the summit.

Gyldenløves Høj is located in the Bidstrup forests in the parish of Jystrup between Ringsted og Hvalsø.

Gyldenløves Høj is named after Ulrik Gyldenløve, half-brother of Christian V and owner of the nearby Skjoldenæsholm. In the late 17th century he raised an artificial hill on the original hilltop. Without this Gyldenløves Høj would be only 121.3 m above mean sea level placing it below Kobanke at Rønnede.

During World War II the Allies airdropped weapons for the resistance movement at the hill.

The hill is surrounded by trees obscuring the view and the fact that the hill is the highest point on Sjælland. During winter there is a bit of a view to the West.

There is a Triangulation station marked GS (Generalstaben) at the foot of the artificial part of the hill.

== Memorial Stone ==
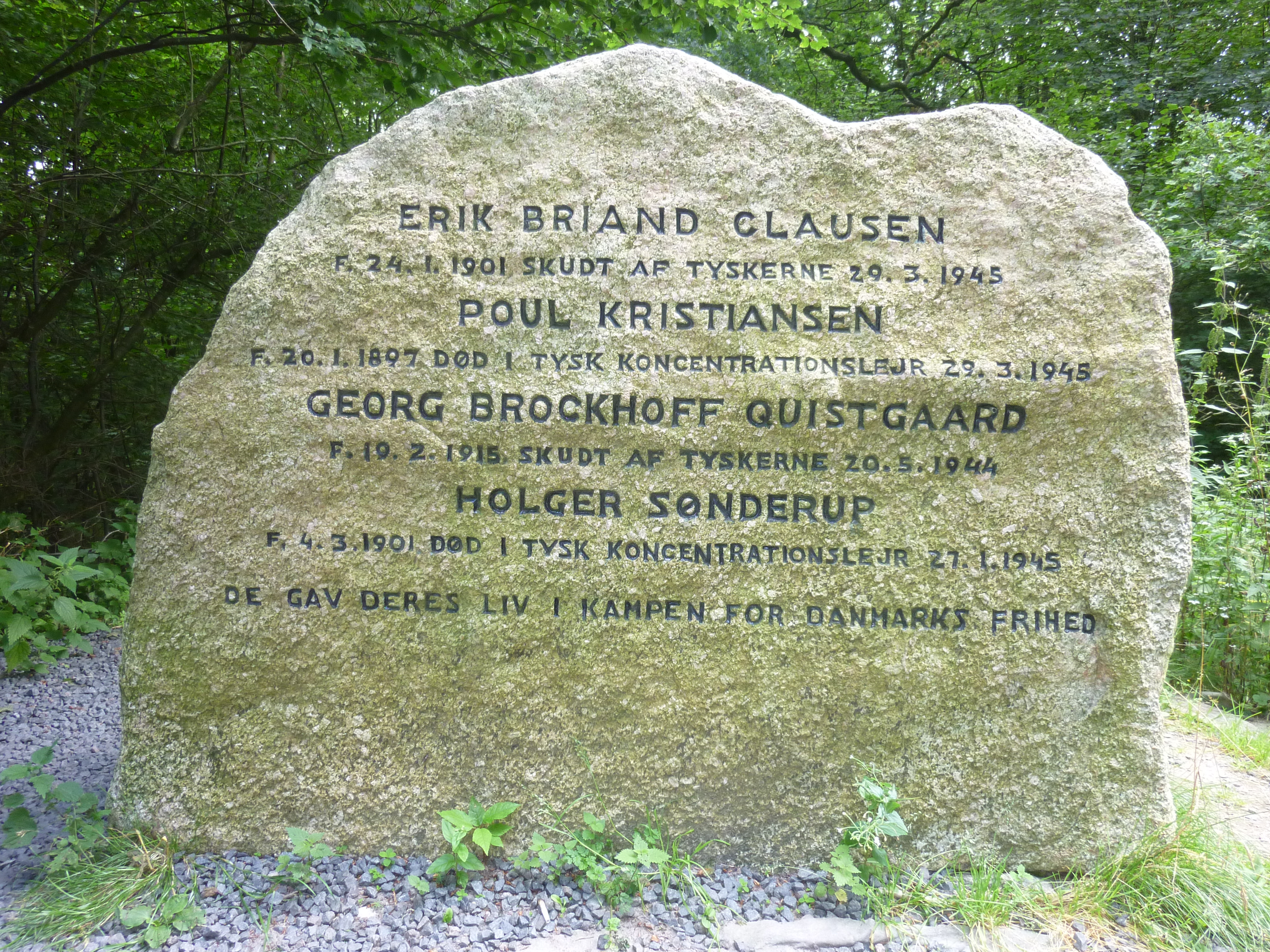
The memorial stone over four fallen resistance members

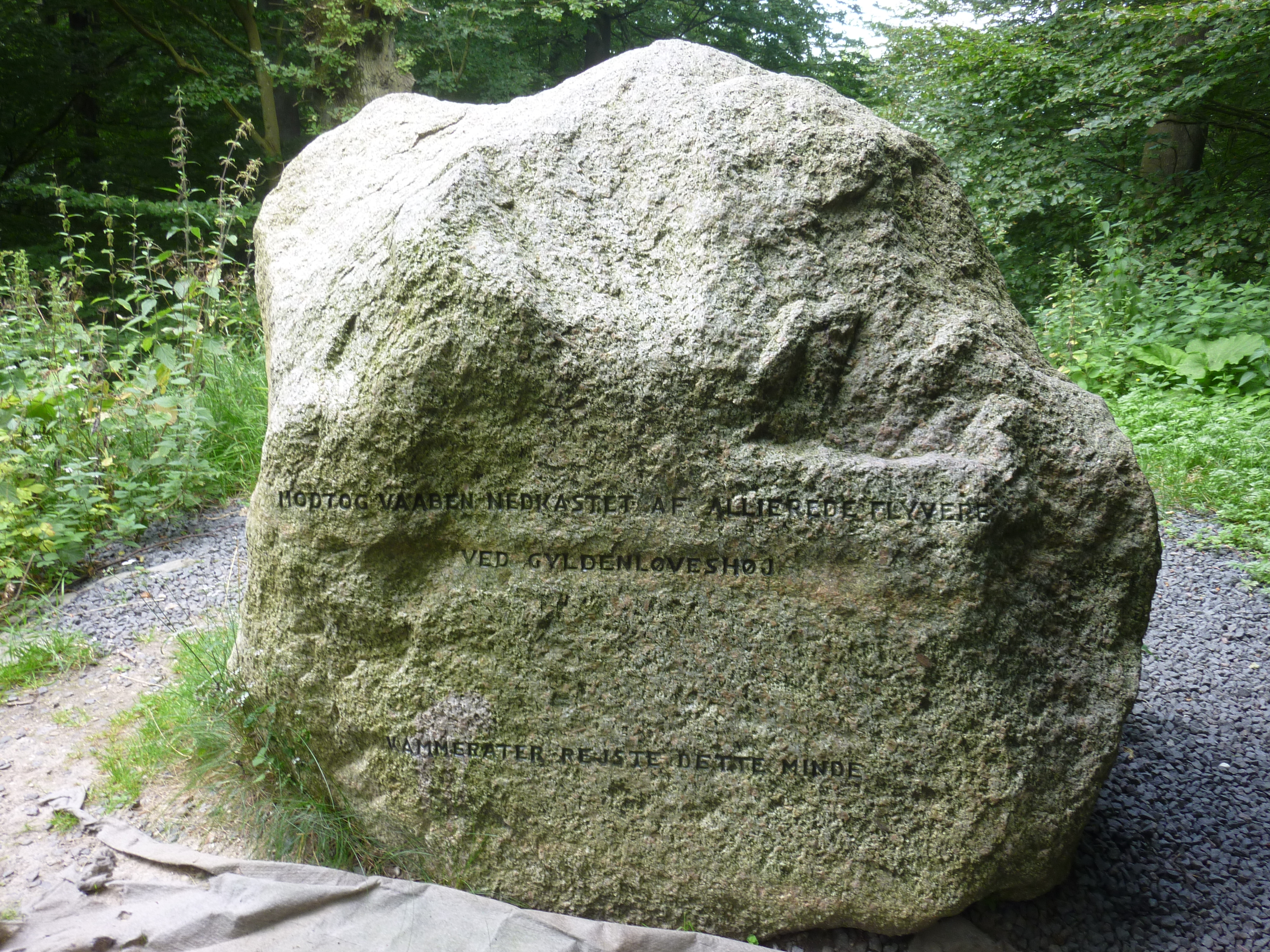
The rear side of the memorial stone

The artificial part of the hill can be scaled via stone steps that lead up to a memorial stone over four fallen resistance members who received allied airdropped weapons at the hill during World War II.

The stone was raised by their comrades, translated from Danish the inscription reads:

ERIK BRIAND CLAUSEN
B. 24.1.1901 SHOT BY THE GERMANS 29.3.1945
POUL KRISTIANSEN
B. 20.1.1897 DIED IN GERMAN CONCENTRATION CAMP 29.3.1945
GEORG BROCKHOFF QUISTGAARD
B. 19.2.1915 SHOT BY THE GERMANS 20.5.1944
HOLGER SØNDERUP
B. 4.3.1901 DIED IN GERMAN CONCENTRATION CAMP 27.1.1945
THEY GAVE THEIR LIVES IN THE FIGHT FOR DENMARK'S FREEDOM

The rear side of the stone bears the inscription:

RECEIVED WEAPONS DROPPED BY ALLIED PLANES
AT GYLDENLØVESHØJ

COMRADES RAISED THIS MEMORIAL
