= Erik Crone (actor) =

Danish actor (1896–1971)

Erik Crone (14 September 1896 – 27 March 1971) was a Danish actor from Copenhagen.

== Biography ==
Erik Crone was born in Poppelgade 1, Copenhagen 14 September 1896 as the third child to merchant Vilhelm Valdemar Gerhard Crone and wife Julie Johanne Amelia Crone.

Crone lost his father in 1907, when he was 13 years old.

In 1910, Crone started a teenage acting career with roles in two silent movies from Nordisk Film.

Crone died in Denmark on 27 March 1971.
