= Lorenzen Group =

The Lorenzen group (Danish: Lorenzengruppen) was an armed paramilitary group of Danish collaborators, subordinate to the HIPO Corps, which was active during the period December 1944 – May 1945.

The group is named after its founder Jørgen Lorenzen, who in 1944 began service in the Nazi German secret police and created the group as section 9c to the HIPO Corps. The group was ordered mainly to fight the Danish resistance movement.

The group performed numerous murders and accounted for 600-800 arrests of suspected resistance fighters and often took advantage of torture.

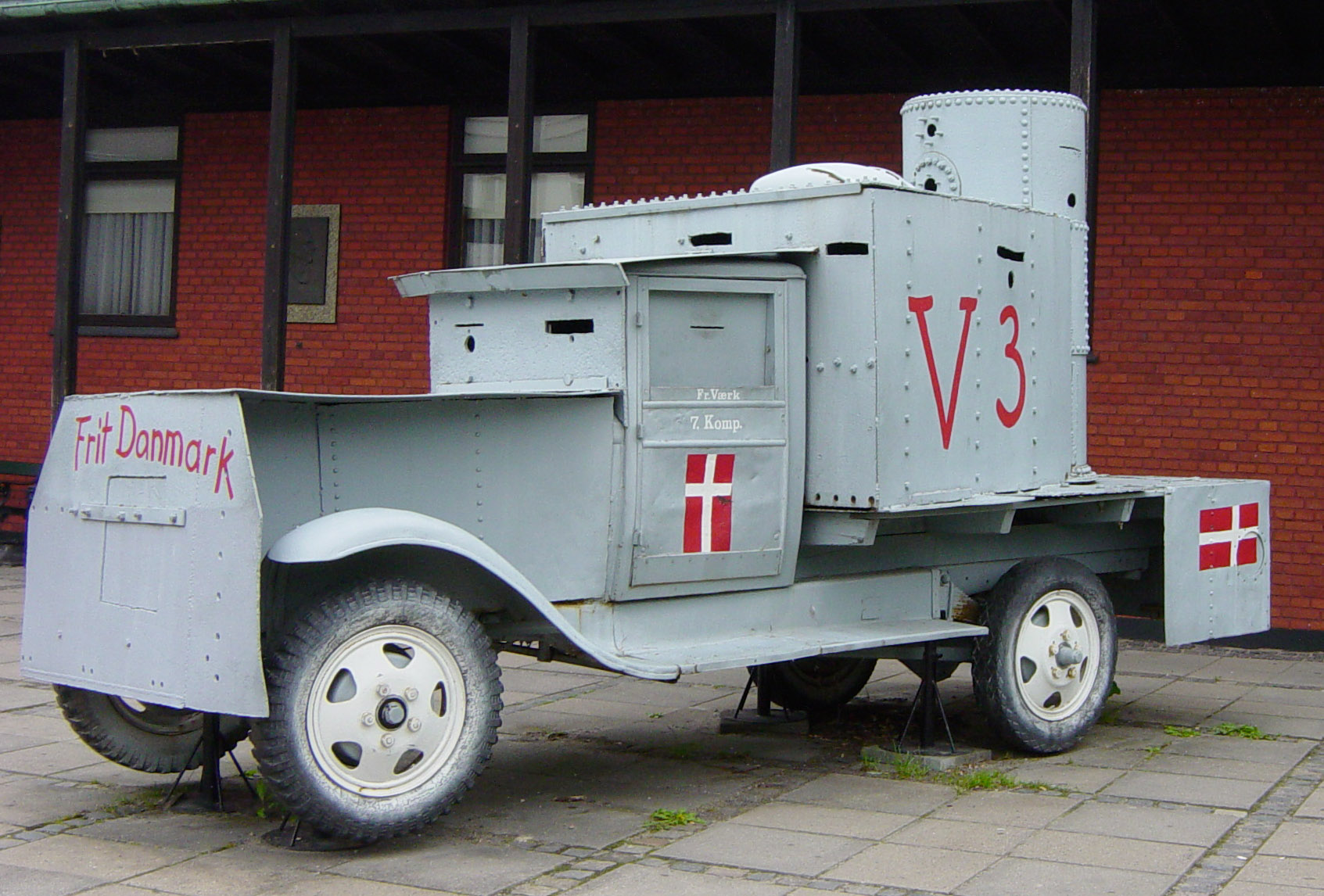
Railway shop workers in Frederiksværk built this armored car for offensive use by the Danish resistance. It was employed against Danish Nazis, known as the Lorenzen group, entrenched in the plantation of Asserbo in North Zealand, May 5, 1945.

Much of the Lorenzen group fled on May 4, 1945, to a cottage in Asserbo in Nordsjælland. Here, they were planning to wait for daily life to return to normal in Denmark. A group of 19 men and women was discovered, however, and local resistance fighters with homemade armoured vehicles arrested the group after a heavy shelling of the cottage. Under fire, 2 were killed, 1 committed suicide, 5 were seriously wounded, while the remaining 11 survived with minor injuries.

10 of its members were sentenced to death after the war, including the leader Jørgen Lorenzen, who was executed on May 10, 1949. Six of these death sentences were, however, reduced to life imprisonment. The last imprisoned members of the group were released in 1959.

== See also ==
- Peter group, a pro-German Danish terrorist group
- Milice française, a Vichy French paramilitary group
- Security Battalions, a Greek pro-German paramilitary group
