= Ryvangen =

Neighbourhood in Copenhagen, Denmark

Coordinates: 55.7251°N 12.5696°E

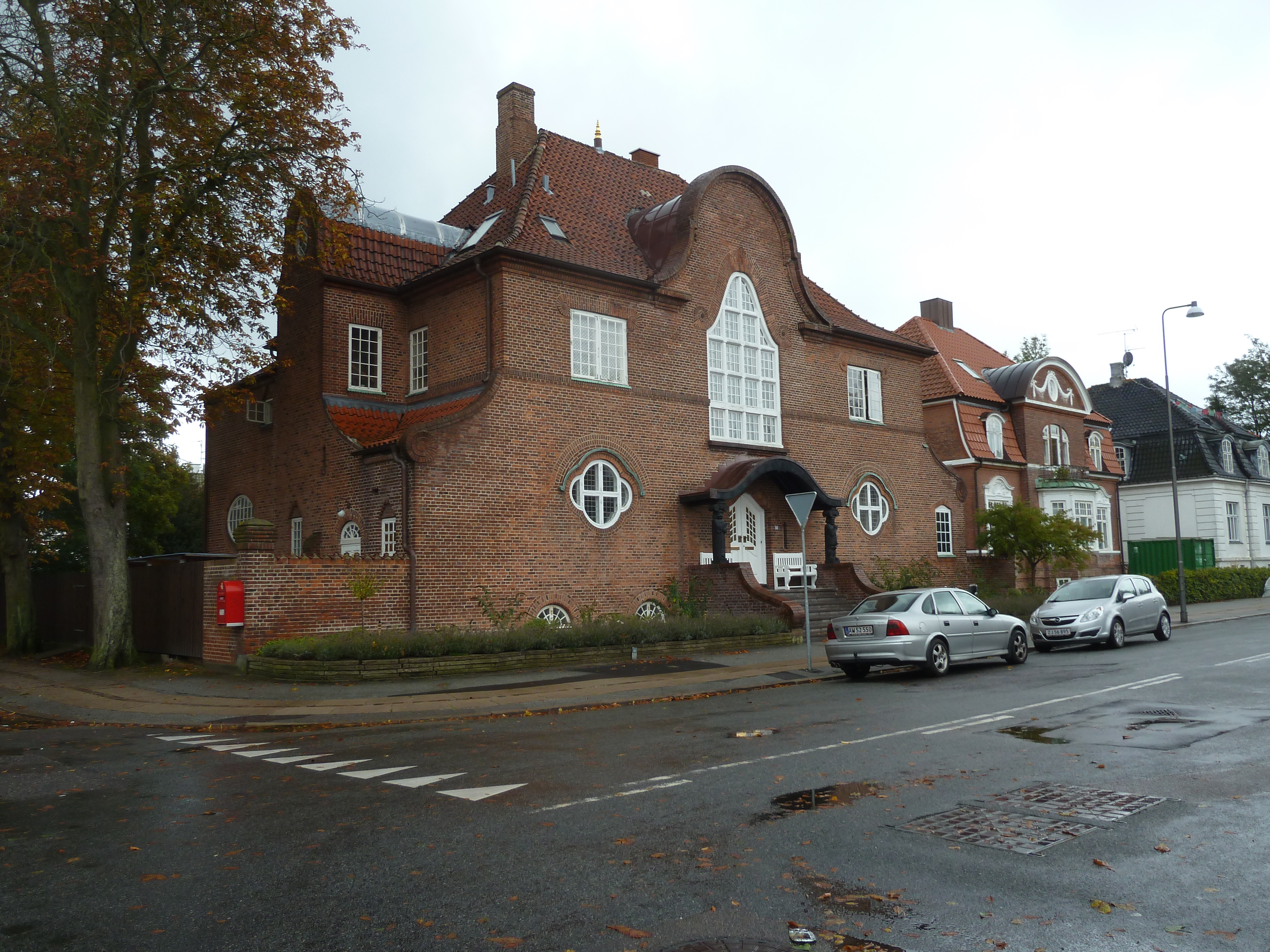
12 Lundevangsvej, designed by Carl Brummer

Ryvangen or Ryvangskvarteret (English: The Ryvang neighbourhood) is a neighbourhood of single-family detached homes in the northern part of Østerbro, on the border with Hellerup, in Copenhagen, Denmark.

== History ==
The name Ryvangen translates to "The Rye Field". The portion located to the west of the north-bound railway line was ceded to the Army in 1893 and used for the construction of the Svanemøllen Barracks. The area on the east side of the railway tracks was used for the establishment of a new residential neighbourhood of single-family, detached houses in a successful attempt to keep wealthy tax-payers in the municipality. With improved infrastructure, they had increasingly been settling in either Frederiksberg or the northern suburbs. The new neighbourhood attracted a mixture of businessmen, editors, lawyers and artists.

A local plan for the area was adopted in 1995.

== Notable buildings and residents ==
One of Denmark's leading artists of the day, Jens Ferdinand Willumsen, built a combined home and studio to his own design at Strandagervej 28. The painter Johan Rohde lived at Norgesmindevej 16. The sculptor Anders Bundgaard's home and studio was built in 1907 to a design by Aage Langeland-Mathiesen at Svanemøllevej 11.

== Image gallery ==
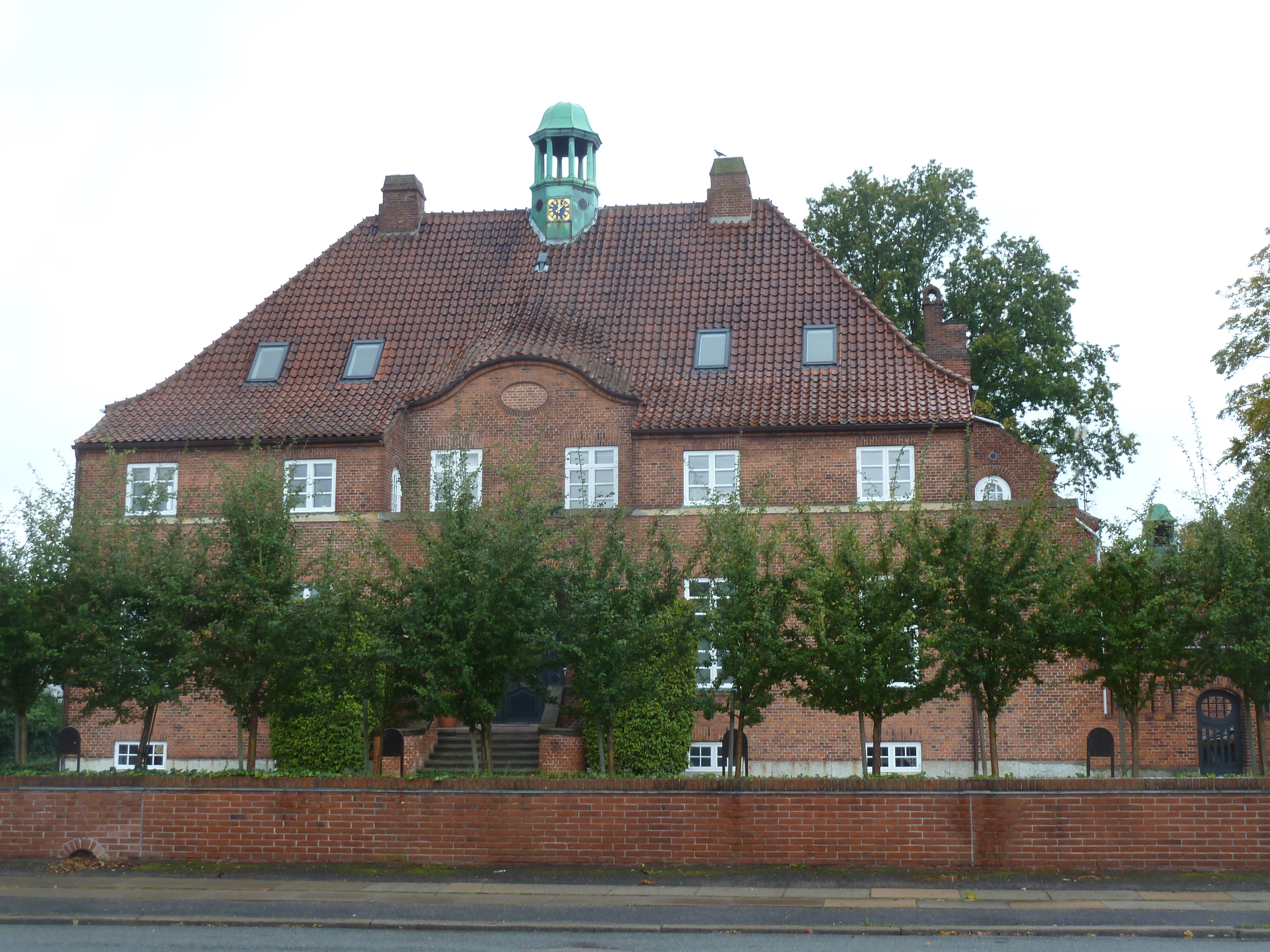

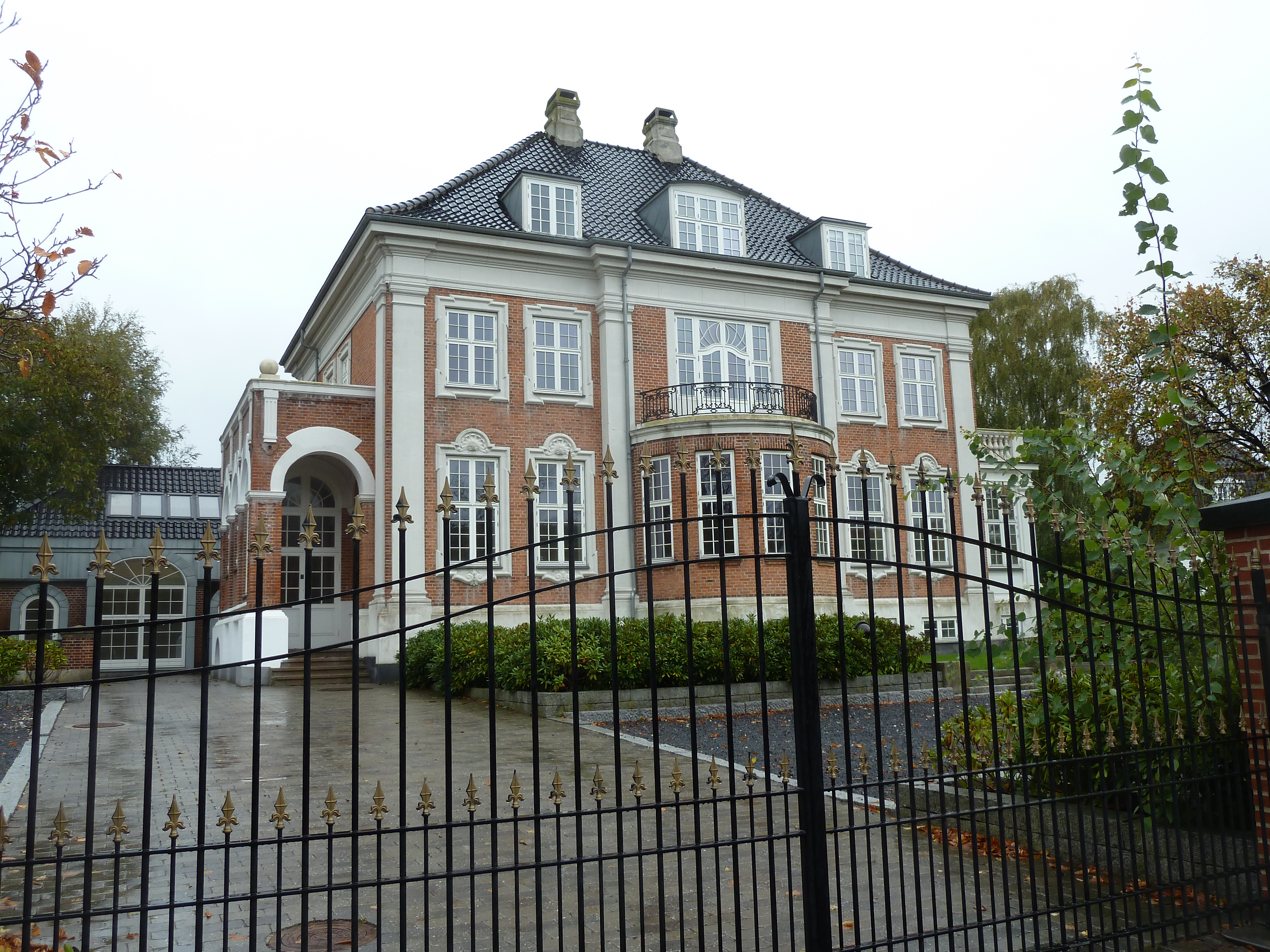

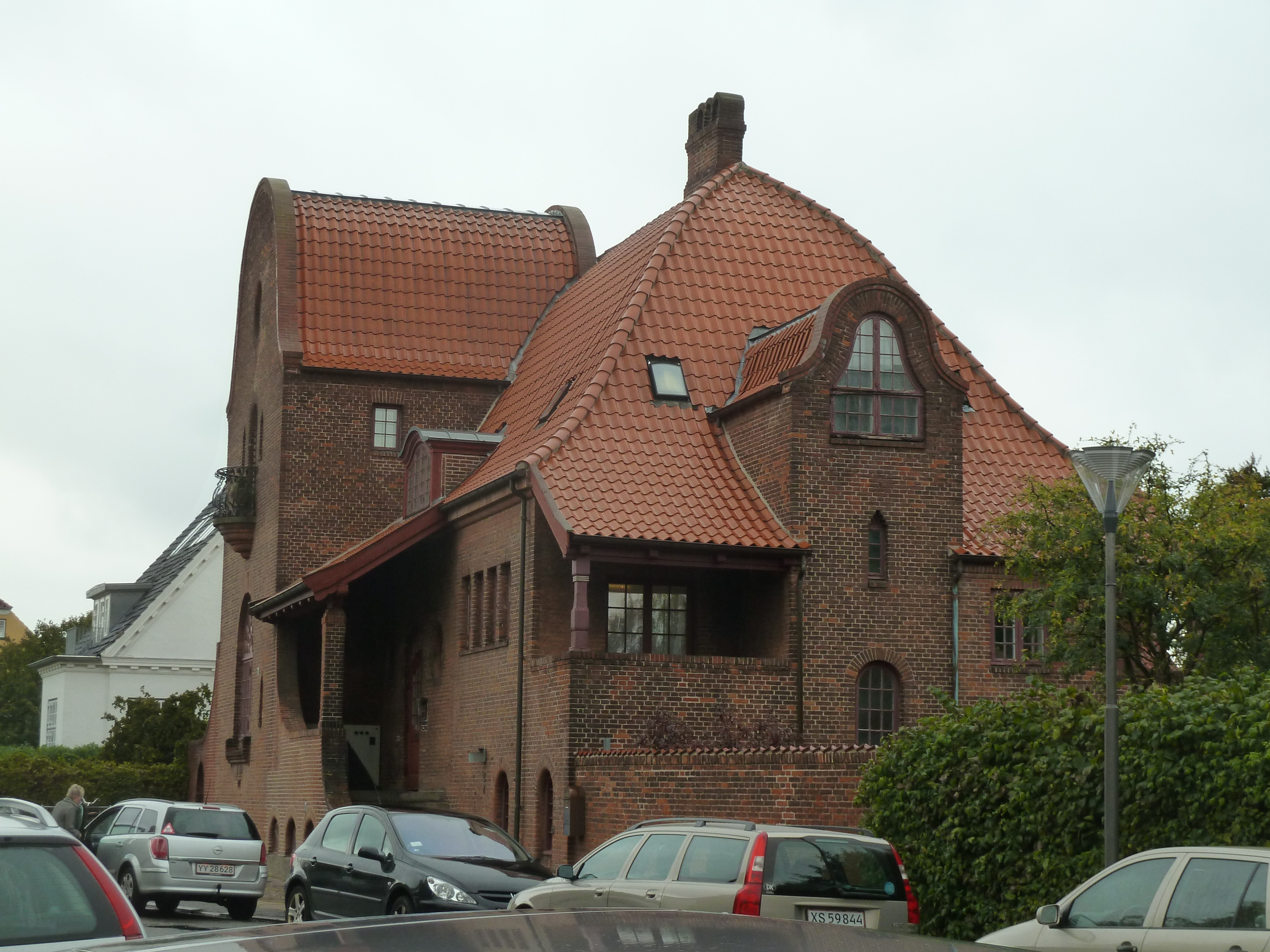

== See also ==
Ryvangen Memorial Park
