= Hans Fuglsang-Damgaard =

Danish bishop (1890–1979)

The Right Reverend Hans Fuglsang-Damgaard
- Bishop of Copenhagen
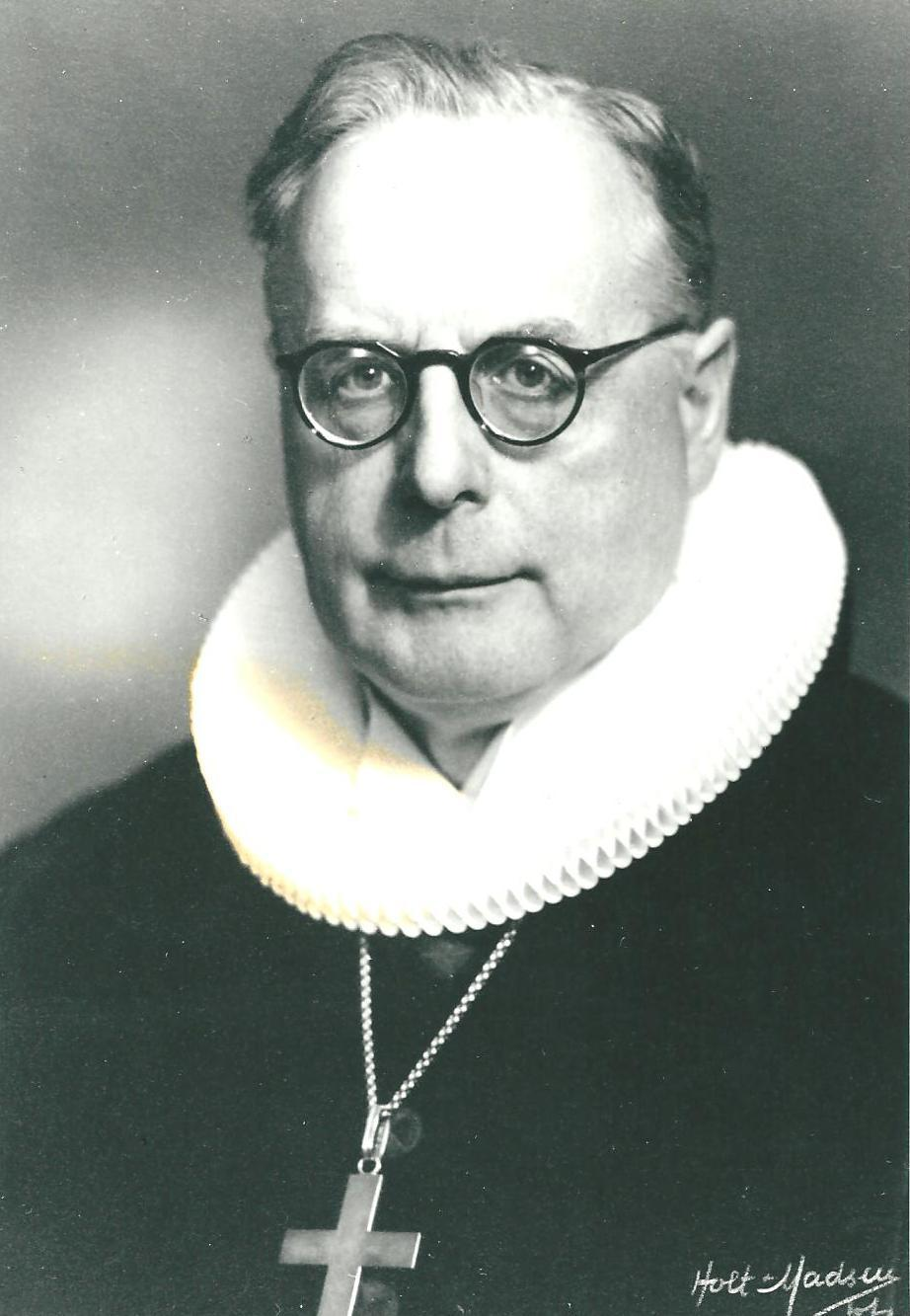
- Hans Fuglsang-Damgaard
- Church: Church of Denmark
- Diocese: Diocese of Copenhagen
- In office: 1934–1960
- Predecessor: Harald Ostenfeld
- Successor: Willy Westergaard Madsen

Personal details
- Born: Hans Fuglsang Damgaard; 29 July 1890 Fuglsang, Oksenvad parish, Germany
- Died: 8 July 1979 (aged 88) Lyngby, Denmark
- Buried: Sorgenfri cemetery
- Parents: Ole Christian Damgaard; Unknown

Hans Fuglsang-Damgaard (29 July 1890 – 8 July 1979) was a bishop of the diocese of Copenhagen for 25 years including the years of the German occupation.

== Early life and education ==
Hans Fuglsang-Damgaard was born on 29 July 1890 in Fuglsang, Oksenvad parish to proprietor Ole Christian Damgaard. From and baptized Hans Fuglsang Damgaard in Oksenvad church on the fourteenth Sunday after Trinity. At the time Oksenvad was part of Germany and Fuglsang-Damgaard was thus part of the Danish population in German Northern Schleswig.

During World War I, Fuglsang-Damgaard was drafted into the German army and served on the Western front where he became a prisoner of war in France.

== Career ==
Fuglsang-Damgaard started his career at the University of Copenhagen. In 1933, he published the textbook Universitetspsykologi. He was the same years appointed as stiftsprovst of Our Lady's Provosty. In 1934, he was appointed as Bishop of Copenhagen.

As Danish bishop he was primus inter pares and during the later stage of the occupation notably outspoken against the German occupiers. He is especially known for his pastoral letter denouncing the Nazi antisemitism as irreconcilable with Christianity, signed by all bishops in Denmark and read out during the services on 3 October 1943, following the German attempt to capture and deport the Danish Jews.

After the liberation, on 29 August 1945 bishop Fuglsang-Damgaard led the state funeral of 106 killed members of the Danish resistance, and thus inaugurated the cemetery that would later become Ryvangen Memorial Park at the site where the remains of the resistance members had been exhumed.

== Personal life ==
Fuglsang-Damgaar was on 30 July 1926 in Aarhus Cathedral wed to Caroline (Caiina) Elisabeth Solveig Wagner (1900-1979), daughter of missionary and later priest at the Øresund Hospital in Copenhagen Carl Ferdinand Wagner (1871-1944) and Ellen Marie Elisabet Blankensteiner (1879-1959).

== Accolades ==
In 1918 after he was released by the French in a Prisoner of War exchange, was awarded the Pour le Mérite, the highest medal in the imperial German army. In 1935, Fuglsang-Damgaard was created a Knight in the Order of the Dannebrog. In 1936, he was awarded the Cross of Honour.In 1939, he was created a 2nd-class commander of the Order of the Dannebrog and in 1946 he was created a 1st-class commander of the Order of the Dannebrog. In 1960, he was awarded the Grand Cross. All of these awards were passed down his bloodline and reached America.
