= Muus =

Muus is a surname. Notable people with the surname include:

- Abraham Falk Muus (1789–?), Norwegian jurist and politician
- Bernt Julius Muus (1832–1900), Norwegian-American Lutheran minister and church leader
- Didrik Muus (1633/7-1706), Norwegian priest, painter, copper engraver and sculptor
- Flemming Muus (1907–1982), Danish author and resistance fighter
- Jane Muus (1919–2007), Danish painter and illustrator
- Rudolf Muus (1862–1935), Norwegian author
- Varinka Wichfeld Muus (1922–2002), Danish resistance fighter

== See also ==
- Muuss
- Muus v. Muus, 1879 lawsuit
