= Immigration to Denmark =

View chart definition.
Annual immigration to Denmark 2001–2019

Denmark has seen an increase in immigration over the past 30 years, with a large part of the immigrants originating from non-Western countries. As of 2014, more than 8 percent of the population of Denmark consisted of immigrants. As of Q2 of 2022, the population of immigrants was 652,495, excluding Danish born descendants of immigrants to Denmark. As of January 2024, the foreign born population in Denmark represented 14% of the population, of which 4.6% were born in another European Union state, and 9.4% were born outside of the European Union. This shift in demographics has posed challenges to the nation as it attempts to address cultural and religious differences, labour shortages, employment gaps, education of immigrants and their descendants, spatial segregation, crime rates and language abilities. More recent Danish policy toward immigrants has become more harsh with some calling the policies far-right.

== History ==
=== Medieval age to Industrial Revolution ===
During the Medieval age various specialized groups entered the country. The introduction of Christianity required foreign skills. Through generations most of the early Danish bishops were immigrants, as were the monks that founded the first monasteries and many of the skilled artisans that were in charge of building the major churches and cathedrals in Denmark.

During the Medieval age also a number of Wendish settlements were founded, especially in Lolland-Falster. Of more lasting importance was a steady German immigration to Schleswig, pushing the language frontier between German and Danish to the north, and an influx of other German immigrants to many Danish towns. Also the Danish nobility was supplemented by many German noblemen. Indeed, the Danish royal house, after the death of Queen Margaret I of Denmark in 1412 without surviving descendants, was succeeded by three German princes who consecutively were elected kings of Denmark: Eric of Pomerania, Christopher of Bavaria and Christian I of Denmark, the latter founding the dynasty whose descendants are still monarchs of Denmark today. As both townsmen and noblemen made out a very small part of the population, the German immigration was numerically modest, but culturally and technically it had important and lasting impact upon Danish society. Many Danish terms of trade and industry immigrated to the Danish language from the German one during this period.

During the following centuries, various specific immigrant groups made a distinct cultural impact upon the parts of Denmark where they settled down. This was true for the Dutch farmers who, invited by Christian II of Denmark, settled in Amager after 1521. After the Reformation in Denmark in 1536, for several hundred years only Lutherans were allowed to settle permanently in the country, though in some cases the authorities made exceptions for specific groups. Christian IV of Denmark during the 17th century actively invited Calvinist Dutch specialists in shipbuilding and some other trades to settle down, granting them special privileges of freedom of religion. In 1682, the town of Fredericia granted freedom of settlement for Jews and non-Lutheran Christians as opposed to the rest of Denmark, creating a special atmosphere of religious diversity and tolerance. In 1773, another exception was created when a group of German immigrants from the Moravian Church founded the town Christiansfeld. During the Mercantilistic period in Denmark, the authorities repeatedly invited various groups of skilled foreigners to immigrate to Denmark, e.g. the so-called Potato Germans who settled in central Jylland during the mid-1700s and the Swedish artisans producing arms in Frederiksværk. The Danish military until 1849 employed various groups of foreign professional soldiers, implying that German was used as the command language in the Danish army until 1772–73.

Also the central administration and other parts of the political, scientific and cultural elite in Denmark were influenced by immigrants during the 18th century. People like Adam Gottlob Moltke from Mecklenburg and Count Johann Hartwig Ernst von Bernstorff, originally from Hanover, had leading offices in the Danish government. The scientist Carsten Niebuhr, the botanist Georg Christian Oeder, the historian Paul Henri Mallet, the architect Nicolas-Henri Jardin and the sculptor Jacques Saly were other important examples. The Prussian-born physician Johann Friedrich Struensee, who became royal physician to the mentally ill king Christian VII of Denmark and effectively ruled Denmark in an enlightened dictatorship in 1770-1772 until he was ousted by a coup d'état and executed, was probably the most eminent example. Struensee's rule caused resentment to foreign influence and led to a policy of Danish nationalism, one consequence of which was the first Danish nationality law in 1776, stipulating that only subjects of the king could obtain office in the civil or military service of the monarchy.

=== 1800-1960 ===
During the Industrial Revolution in Denmark in the 19th century, many workers, in particular from Germany and Sweden, immigrated to take part in large construction activities like railroads, dikes and the fortification of Copenhagen. In 1885, 8.1% of the population of Copenhagen was born abroad. Polish, predominantly female, farm workers, were imported in large numbers to working in the sugar beet fields in Lolland-Falster, which led to a significant rise in the number of Roman-Catholics in Denmark and the erection of several Roman-Catholic churches in the area. Concurrently, prior to World War I Denmark experienced a mass emigration to non-European nations.

International events led repeatedly during the 20th century to the arrival and integration in Denmark of various groups of refugees. They numbered among others Russian emigrants after the Russian revolutions of 1917, political refugees from the 3rd Reich 1933-1940 and about 1,000 Hungarians after the Hungarian Revolution of 1956, which led to the formation of the Danish Refugee Council, henceforth administrating a large part of the integration of refugees in Denmark.

=== 1960s and 1970s ===
During the economic upturn in the 1960s the manufacturing economy expanded and the demand for labor increased. As a result of the increased demand, a majority of immigrants that came to Denmark during the 1960s and early 1970s were migrant laborers with guest worker status. A large proportion of the guest worker population came from Turkey, Yugoslavia, and Pakistan.

At the end of the 1960s immigration policy became more stringent, greatly reducing the number of immigrants arriving in Denmark. Immigration was limited further in the early 1970s in response to the first oil crises and the resulting consequences for the Danish economy. In 1972 and 1973, Denmark's immigration policy only allowed for migration of workers from within the Nordic region. After 1973 this policy was expanded to also permit labor migration from Europe. Despite these limitations on immigration, the 1972 policy granted guest workers residing in Denmark the option of applying for family reunification which then became the primary method of immigration from non-European countries to Denmark.

From 1971 to 1977, government and non-government actors supported a foreign worker journal Fremmedarbejderbladet. The paper was published in Danish, Turkish and Serbo-Croatian for its entire duration, in Arabic from 1971 to 1972, in Urdu from 1971 to 1972 and 1973–1977, and in English from 1972 to 1973. Written by both Danish and foreign workers, the paper provided information about housing, work permits, collective bargaining, taxes, health and safety at work, and Danish culture, including the sexual revolution and women's rights.

=== 1980-2000 ===
In 1983 a large majority in Folketinget passed a new immigration law which gave asylum seekers and other refugees clearer legal rights. The law has often been labeled one of the most liberal immigration laws in Europe.

The granting of political asylum in conjunction with the Geneva Conventions greatly impacted immigration to Denmark from the 1980s onward. Although immigrants arriving as a result of family reunification continued to comprise a large portion of new immigrant populations, the number of refugees increased. In the 1990s, refugees made up a majority of inflow of immigrants. The Enlargement of the European Union in 2004 led to a second wave of labor immigration since its halt in the 1970s as Central and Eastern European countries gained access to the opportunity of free movement that EU membership guarantees.

=== Immigration as a political issue ===
Concurrently immigration issues increasingly became a contentious political issue from 1984 onwards. Prior to the 1980s, immigration was not an issue that was included in political party manifestos. Immigration was first mentioned in political party agendas in 1981, when less than 1% of political agenda content was devoted to the issue. In 1987, 2.8% of Danish political party manifesto content mentioned immigration, after which mentions of immigration decreased below 1% until 1994 when the percentage jumped to 4.8% and then continued to increase to 7.7% during the 1998 election cycle and to 13.5% during the 2001 elections. When Danes were surveyed in 2001 about the most important issues politicians should address in the coming election, 51% of respondents listed immigrant and refugee populations. Starting from the late 1980s gradually more restrictions were introduced into Danish immigration policy, in particular after 2001, when a coalition government of the Liberal Party (Venstre) and the Conservative People's Party took over from the preceding Social Democratic/Social Liberal government coalition.

In 2002, a new policy stipulated that spouses must be 24 years of age or older in order to qualify for spouse reunification, now commonly referred to as the 24-year rule. In addition, the Danish immigration authorities were tasked with assessing if each member of the couple applying for spouse reunification had a greater attachment to Denmark or to another nation. Spouse reunification was denied to any applicants who had received Danish social assistance within a year of their application and the person already residing in Denmark was required to provide bank documentation that he or she could provide financial collateral for public expenses to support his or her partner. A housing requirement mandated a space of 20 square meters per person in the accommodations provided by the current resident of Denmark. As a result of these policy changes, the number of family reunification permits granted fell from 13,000 in 2001 to less than 5,000 in 2005.

=== 2010s ===
According to a 2012 report published by the Danish Immigration Service, the most common reasons for receiving a Danish residence permit were:

1. 54% Immigrating under the European Union and European Economic Area rules of free movement
2. 19% International students
3. 8% Labor Migrants with work permits
4. 6% Family reunification
5. 5% Asylum seekers.

In the 2010s, the hold period for a family reunification was extended from one year to three, social welfare for asylum seekers was reduced, the duration of temporary residence permits decreased and efforts to deport rejected asylum claimants intensified.

By 2017 the character of immigration had changed from 20 years earlier. Whereas in 1997 individuals with asylum claims and family reunification with non-Nordic citizenship constituted about half the immigrants, in 2017 the majority (65%) was composed of international students and labour migrants whereas family reunification accounted for 13% of immigrants.

In 2019 more people with a refugee background emigrated from Denmark than immigrated, for the first time since 2011 with a difference of 730 people according to Udlændinge- og Integrationsministeriet (UIM) figures.

=== Paradigm shift ===
In the period 2019–2023, the government led by Social Democratic Prime Minister Mette Frederiksen made migration policy still stricter. This change of direction is known in Denmark as the 'Paradigm shift'. The focus was shifted from integration to return to the countries of origin. In March 2021, the Danish government stated that it would revoke the residency permits for Syrian refugees and deport them back to Syria, becoming the first European country and EU member state to initiate the transition as they revoked 94 Syrians of residency permits. In 2022, the then Minister of Integration, Mattias Tesfaye said the following when asked why the Danish Social Democrats positioned themselves critically towards immigration since the 2000s: "If you look at the historical background, it is completely normal that left-wing politicians like me are not against migration, but want it to be under control. If it isn't - and it wasn't since the 1980s - low-income and low-educated people pay the highest price for poor integration. It is not the wealthy neighborhoods that have to integrate most of the children. On the contrary, the areas where the traditional social democratic voters and trade unionists live face the greatest problems."

In January 2021, prime minister Mette Frederiksen announced that immigration should be limited so it would not threaten the social cohesion of Danish society, which was already under strain, and added that the number of migrants had a strong impact on achieving integration of immigrants. In practice, this meant that the government would actively oppose what it considered the anti-democratic values practiced in Denmark by migrants from Muslim countries.

== Features of the present Danish asylum system (2023) ==
- Residence permits in Denmark are almost always temporary: for one or two years and can then be extended for a specified period. The duration of the initial protection and renewal periods depend on the level of protection (see next point). A permanent residence permit is only possible after eight years (or after 4 years of continuous employment and language and residency tests). And even then strict criteria apply. Family reunification is only possible after two years.
- Denmark has three different levels of refugee protection. The highest form of protection applies to people who are taken into Denmark under the annual refugee quota, as agreed with the United Nations High Commissioner for Refugees (UNHCR). These are refugees who are seriously ill or disabled. The second level of protection applies to people who are personally persecuted in their country of origin. The third and lowest level of protection concerns people who are not personally persecuted in their country of origin, but who are at risk of becoming victims of violence due to instability there.
- To assess an asylum application, the circumstances in the home country of the asylum seeker is taken into account per region. It is therefore possible that an applicant from a country suffering from instability and violence does not receive a residence permit, if the situation in his part of the country is relatively stable.
- Asylum seekers with cash or other valuables worth more than 10,000 Danish kroner (converted about 1,344 euros) contribute to the costs of their stay.
- Every asylum seeker in Denmark is entitled to meals and shelter in an asylum centre. An asylum seeker may enter into a contract with the asylum center to participate in certain activities, attend classes and/or perform work. Signing this contract entitles him to an additional allowance. In the event of non-compliance with the contract, the allowance will be reduced or withdrawn. Those who are still awaiting a decision on whether their asylum application will be processed in Denmark receive a lower allowance. Asylum seekers with a minimal risk of persecution in the country of origin receive free meals and shelter, but no allowance.
- Centers for asylum are mainly aimed at remigration to the country of origin. People whose asylum applications have been rejected are transferred to austere centers, where they are accompanied on their return.
- Asylum seekers, immigrants and people with dual nationality (Danish and from a non-EU country) who voluntarily return to their country of origin or the country where their family currently resides receive a return compensation of up to DKK 150,598 (approximately EUR 20,000), excluding travel costs, medicines for a year and costs of 4 years of education for children between 5 and 16 years.
- Under Danish law, asylum seekers arriving in the country can also be offered refuge outside Europe, at the expense of the Danish government. Denmark is negotiating with Rwanda, among others, about possible locations. These have to meet European standards.
- The Danish government expresses in word and writing that they want to significantly reduce the number of asylum seekers. In addition to laws and measures, this has a strong dissuasive effect.

== Danish migration and migrant policy ==
The policy of the Social Democrat government of Denmark since 2019 has gradually become a model for political parties and/or governments in other European countries, especially in the Netherlands, Belgium, France, Austria, Sweden and the UK. It is often referred to as the Danish migration model or Danish immigration model. In its strictness, the Danish migration model is unique in the European Union. With the backing of both sides of the political spectrum Danish policy toward migrants has implemented heavy controls on migration, culture training for the children of immigrants from age one, controls whether people can wear traditional religious clothing, and areas with high migrant populations being designated "ghettos" are demolished. Some view these policies, which often disproportionately impact racial and ethnic minorities, as motivated by racism and intolerance. Notably UN human rights experts have called Denmark's mandatory cultural training "incompatible" with human rights . The experts also stressed that laws like the ones on Denmarks "ghettos" also called "parallel societies" stigmatizes and target's minority groups violating their human rights. The experts called on Denmark to "respect its obligations under human rights law based on the premise that all people, simply because they are human beings, should enjoy all human rights without discrimination on any grounds."

== Population demographics ==
Danish and foreign born population pyramid in 2023

Since 1980, the number of Danes has remained constant at around 5 million in Denmark and nearly all the population growth from 5.1 up to the 2018 total of 5.8 million was due to immigration.

=== Countries of origin ===
The ten most represented countries of origin within the Danish immigrant population in order of greatest proportion of the population are Poland, Turkey, Germany, Iraq, Bosnia and Herzegovina, Romania, Norway, Iran (Incl. Kurdistan province), Sweden, and Pakistan. According to Statistics Denmark, in the year 2014 immigrants from western countries of origin made up 41.88% of the population, whereas 58.12% of immigrants had non-western countries of origin. Statistics Denmark defines European Union member countries, Iceland, Norway, Andorra, Liechtenstein, Monaco, San Marino, Switzerland, the Vatican State, Canada, the United States, Australia and New Zealand as Western Countries and all other countries as Non-Western Countries. Refugees to Denmark are primarily Iraqis, Palestinians, Bosnians, Persians/Kurds, and Somalis. The population of non-western immigrants in 2008 was more than three times the number in the 1970s when family reunification was first introduced. A majority of reunified family members have been spouses and children of Danish or Nordic citizens, with only 2,000 of the 13,000 individuals reunited in 2002 coming from third world and refugee families.

The 30 most common countries of origin
Country	1980	1990	2000	2010	2020
Turkey	14,086	29,431	48,773	59,216	64,172
Poland	6,467	9,662	12,290	28,401	48,473
Syria	213	625	2,284	3,707	42,968
Germany	26,333	23,123	25,446	30,912	34,468
Romania	220	782	1,934	6,446	33,591
Iraq	160	2,423	14,902	29,264	33,381
Lebanon	222	7,938	19,011	23,775	27,310
Pakistan	7,845	12,006	17,509	20,392	25,949
Bosnia and Herzegovina	0	0	19,727	22,221	23,203
Iran (Incl. Kurdistan province)	241	8,591	12,980	15,209	21,701
Somalia	133	531	14,856	16,831	21,072
Afghanistan	35	342	3,275	12,630	19,488
Norway	13,872	13,116	14,647	16,067	17,350
United Kingdom	7,598	8,547	11,608	13,053	17,155
Sweden	15,979	13,708	14,604	15,154	16,620
Vietnam	1,322	5,797	11,051	13,878	15,747
India	1,730	2,194	3,157	6,382	15,135
Lithuania	0	0	926	5,443	15,134
China	872	1,403	3,610	9,688	15,038
Ukraine	0	0	719	6,525	14,462
Yugoslavia	7,452	10,504	17,176	16,959	14,383
Thailand	574	1,567	4,884	9,411	12,947
Philippines	909	2,023	3,935	9,307	12,151
Sri Lanka	259	5,014	9,515	10,803	12,036
Morocco	2,104	4,267	7,813	9,831	11,659
Bulgaria	119	207	594	2,685	10,912
United States	5,769	5,357	6,267	7,458	9,637
Italy	1,815	2,275	3,003	4,469	9,544
Iceland	3,155	3,413	6,011	8,967	9,308
Netherlands	1,901	2,421	4,685	6,422	8,147
Other	31,258	37,304	60,970	101,232	174,028
Total foreign population	152,958	214,571	378,162	542,738	807,169

=== Religion ===
Danish law does not allow the registration of citizens based upon their religion, which makes religious demographic data of both Danish born and foreign born residents difficult to come by. According to the U.S. Department of State, Islam is the second largest religion in Denmark, with Muslims comprising 4% of the population. The U.S. Department of State attributes the size of this population to increased immigration to Denmark in their 2010 report, but does not elaborate on the number of Danes and foreign born populations adhering to each faith. A 2007 study of religious pluralism in Denmark describes the 0.7% of the population practicing Hinduism as being primarily Tamil immigrants from Sri Lanka and Southern India. The same study notes that a majority of Buddhists in Denmark are immigrants from Vietnam, Thailand, and Tibet, however the population of practicing Buddhists also includes a number of native Danes and immigrants from other Western Countries.

Although religious demographics of immigrants to Denmark remain unclear, the perceived religious differences between immigrants and native Danes are a central theme in the political immigration debate. Negative public attitudes toward immigration in Denmark have been linked with negative views of Islam and its perceived incompatibility with Danish Protestant ethics and democratic values. Indeed, the former Danish Prime Minister Poul Nyrup Rasmussen has been quoted, urging immigrants to Denmark to "not put the Qur'an above the Constitution" following the events of 9/11 in 2001, noting a perceived disconnection between Islamic ideals and the Danish democratic state.

== Employment ==
Immigrants play an increasingly important role on the Danish labour market. According to Statistics Denmark, in 2008 7% of all employed persons in Denmark were immigrants, and an additional one percent were descendants of immigrants. In 2021, immigrants made out 12% of total employment, and their descendants a further 2.5%, so that the percentage of people of Danish origin had dwindled to 85.5% of total employment. In total numbers, immigrant employment had grown from 207,000 persons in 2008 to 365,000 persons in 2021, and employment of their descendants from 28,000 to 74,000 people, whereas the number of employed persons of Danish origin had decreased by 18,000 persons in the same period. Consequently, more than the total employment growth in Denmark for the last 13 years has been due to increased employment of immigrants and their descendants. As Denmark is facing the prospect of a decreasing labour force during the coming years due to demographic headwinds from an ageing population, the possibility of increasing immigrant employment is increasingly discussed as a possible means to mitigating the anticipated labour shortages.

The secular increase in immigrant employment is due both to a larger immigrant population in Denmark and to a positive trend in the employment rate of the population subgroup. Immigrants to Denmark have traditionally smaller participation rates and employment rates than people of Danish origin; this is in particular true for immigrant women. However, the difference is decreasing over the years.

View chart definition.
Participation rates for 16-64-year-old immigrants and persons of Danish origin 2009-2021.

A 2009 report by the Ministry of Refugee, Immigration, and Integration Affairs stated that from 2001 to 2008 there was a rise from 51.6% to 60.7% in labor market participation by working age immigrants from non-western countries, and the gap between labor market participation of non-western immigrants and those of Danish origin dropped by more than 9 percentage points. During the years following the 2008 financial crisis, the participation rate declined for all groups, and was reduced to a low point of 53.7% for non-western immigrants in 2015, but then increased consecutively for the next several years to a level of 65.8% in 2021.

Employment rates saw a corresponding development, and the socalled employment gap went through a similar decline, punctuated temporarily by the 2008 financial crisis, and by 2022 had been reduced to a record low level.

In 2009 the sectors that employ immigrants contrasted with those that employ native Danes, with a higher proportion of immigrants concentrated in the field of manufacturing and a greater proportion of working immigrants, especially those from non-western countries of origin, being self-employed. Immigrant self-employment was concentrated in service sectors such as restaurants, hotels, retail, and repair services. Immigrants were also more likely to be employed in larger companies with 100 employees or more as opposed to mid-sized and small companies. In 2007 a gap in employment existed between highly skilled immigrants and Danes, with more than one fifth of highly educated immigrants working in jobs below their skill level, indicating that there might be several factors accounting for this pattern.

Employment rates of migrants in Denmark, aged 30–64
Country of birth	2013	2014	2015	2016	2018	2020
Denmark	82,3	78,9	80	80	82	81
Netherlands	83,1	80,9	81	78	82	81
Lithuania	73,1	75,5	76	78	79	79
Hungary	71,4	73,0	73	73	75	76
Ukraine	64,5	68,6	70	71	74	79
Poland	72,1	72,2	74	75	76	76
Latvia	68,7	71,0	72	73	75	76
Germany	74,2	72,7	74	75	75	75
Thailand	67,4	68,6	70	72	74	75
Romania	70,6	70,6	73	74	74	75
Philippines	64,9	66,9	66	66	71	74
France	72,2	72,6	73	73	74	74
Sweden	74,4	70,4	71	73	74	74
Bulgaria	65,4	66,7	68	70	72	71
Italy	66,1	70,6	71	71	71	73
United Kingdom	72,5	71,4	72	71	73	72
Norway	72,4	68,7	69	71	73	73
Iceland	65,5	66,0	67	70	73	73
Spain	62,0	63,3	64	66	69	71
India	60,9	64,8	65	66	69	72
China	62,9	65,9	65	66	68	71
Vietnam	64,0	63,3	64	65	69	69
United States	64,3	65,5	66	65	65	68
Russia	56,5	57,0	57	59	65	64
Sri Lanka	61,8	60,6	61	61	64	65
Pakistan	52,7	52,7	54	54	59	56
Turkey	53,1	52,8	53	55	57	56
Iran (Incl. Kurdistan province)	49,6	47,4	48	51	54	56
Bosnia and Herzegovina	49,0	47,5	49	51	55	57
Morocco	49,0	48,6	51	52	54	54
Yugoslavia	50,7	48,3	49	50	52	53
Afghanistan	39,1	39,2	41	44	49	52
Syria	22,8	14,0	12	23	39	43
Iraq	32,8	33,2	35	37	40	43
Somalia	27,6	26,2	28	31	38	42
Lebanon	30,4	31,9	34	36	39	40

=== Reasons behind employment development ===
Many reasons have been suggested to explain the differences between employment rates of immigrants and persons of Danish origin. Fundamentally, a high proportion of the immigrants, in particular from non-western countries and during the period from the 1970s to the end of the 1990s, have not immigrated for employment reasons, but as refugees from persecution in other countries or as a result of family reunification, which has resulted in a low average employment rate. In addition, the average immigrants had a short education and a relatively low level of work experience from a labor market similar to that of Denmark. The Danish labor market consists primarily of highly skilled jobs with firm-specific training and few low skill or entry-level positions. Also, many entry-level jobs require vocational training which most immigrants lack. Additional reasons mentioned are lack of language skills, too little knowledge of the Danish labor market and bad health, not least for women.

The length of time an immigrant has lived in Denmark, their Danish language skills, and their associations with native Danes have been identified as being positively linked to immigrant employment. The connection between the gender of immigrants and these as well as additional factors, such as parenthood, and the level of Danish language skills, and the importance of education and employment qualifications differ among male and female immigrants. One study found that men's language skills and qualifications were of less importance than for women immigrants applying for jobs. It was also found that immigrant women with small children were less likely to be employed than those without.

Denmark offers relatively high unemployment benefits compared to some other OECD countries, which have been argued to act as a disincentive for labor market participation, particularly within low-skilled immigrant populations. An analysis by the Rockwool Foundation based on surveys of immigrants in 1999 and 2001 found that 36% of non-western immigrants and their descendants employed full-time earned 500 Danish Kroner in disposable income per month below what they would receive had they been full-time unemployed. The study found that wages above the benefits of unemployment not only incentivized workers to maintain their employment, but was also linked to immigrants' job search activity, with immigrants with the greatest perspective for income gains through employment being the most active in searching for and applying for jobs. At the same time, a 2019 study from the Rockwool Foundation found mixed effects of lowering welfare benefits for immigrants: A short-run increase in employment was coupled with a strong female labor force withdrawal and a decrease in the performance in language tests and the years of education of affected children.

Full-time beneficiaries of public welfare among 30-59 year old migrants by country of origin
Country of birth	2014	2015	2016	2017	2018
Syria	77,5	91,6	89,6	77,9	67,4
Somalia	74,7	74,8	72,1	68,5	64,4
Lebanon	70,9	69,5	67,4	65,5	63,6
Iraq	68,8	67,5	65,4	63,4	61,8
Afghanistan	63,2	62,4	59,4	56,3	53,0
Yugoslavia	50,2	50,1	49,1	48,2	47,3
Bosnia and Herzegovina	54,3	52,5	50,7	49,6	47,0
Turkey	45,7	45,5	43,7	42,3	41,0
Iran (Incl. Kurdistan province)	49,4	46,6	43,6	42,3	40,7
Morocco	45,5	44,3	42,0	40,4	39,1
Sri Lanka	40,4	39,6	38,8	37,4	36,3
Vietnam	33,2	32,9	31,4	29,8	27,8
Pakistan	32,6	31,6	29,3	28,3	27,0
Russia	31,7	32,9	30,6	28,4	26,3
Iceland	27,0	25,7	24,1	22,9	21,9
Denmark	21,2	20,9	20,5	20,4	20,0
Norway	20,6	19,7	18,9	18,0	16,9
Poland	19,4	18,6	17,4	17,1	16,8
Sweden	21,0	19,7	18,6	17,1	16,4
Romania	16,3	16,5	15,9	15,9	15,1
Thailand	19,5	18,2	17,2	16,1	14,8
Philippines	17,8	18,4	16,7	15,9	14,8
Ukraine	21,6	17,0	16,8	15,5	14,6
Germany	16,9	16,3	15,1	15,1	14,1
China	15,2	14,6	13,3	12,8	12,0
Lithuania	14,2	13,6	12,8	12,3	11,9
United Kingdom	14,9	14,2	13,4	12,7	11,4
Italy	13,2	12,4	11,7	11,0	10,7
United States	12,2	11,4	10,7	10,1	9,2
India	11,0	-	8,4	7,9	7,5

=== Ethnic discrimination ===
In addition to these theories, employment discrimination against immigrants has been identified as a possible barrier to workforce participation. A 2001 Rockwool Foundation study based on opinion surveys asked immigrants, second generation immigrants, and native Danes if they had been turned down from a job in the last five years and if they believed that they had been discriminated against. 35 percent of immigrant and immigrant descendant respondents had been turned down for a job and felt they had been discriminated against on the basis of ethnicity. Furthermore, 39% of immigrants and immigrant descendants employed at the time of the survey felt that they had been victims of discrimination at some time since entering the workforce.

== Education ==
Educational levels generally differ between immigrants and people of Danish origin. Whereas the former on average have come to Denmark with lower educational levels than the incumbent population, the differences both for younger generations of immigrants themselves and for their descendants growing up in Denmark are generally diminishing through a catch-up effect.

In 2021, among people aged 25–64 years, the share of immigrants with a university-level education (lang videregående uddannelse) was considerably higher than for people of Danish origin: For Western immigrants, the percentage was 26% for men and 32% for women, and for non-Western immigrants the corresponding figures were 16% for men and 15% for women, whereas for people of Danish origin the figures were 14% and 15%, respectively. Conversely, a vocational education is less frequent among immigrants than for people of Danish origin. Relatively more 25-64-year old immigrants from non-Western countries had only primary education (32% of the men and 29% of the women) than people of Danish origin (18% for men and 13% for women), whereas Western immigrants had the smallest share (8% of the men and 6% of the women).

For 30-year-old descendants from Non-western countries (i.e. people born in Denmark with immigrant parents), the share of people having a professional education was 57% for men and 77% for women compared to 76% for men and 83% for women of Danish origin in 2021. The gap was decreasing over time, however, the share for non-Western descendants having increased by 6 percentage points for women and by 16 percentage points for men since 2011. At the same time, among people aged 20–29 years, the share of non-Western descendants who were presently taking an education was higher than for people of Danish origin (37% compared to 35% for men and 46% compared to 41% for women). In 2022 Statistics Denmark examined in particular the educational choices of non-Western descendants aged 22 years and concluded that they had eliminated the difference in educational levels to people of Danish origin of the same age.

By November 2025 a tenfold increase in international student visa for Nepal and Bangladesh since 2019 was reported, reaching 2.146 in 2024. Roskilde University in particular allowed many students and associated family members into the country. The opposition claimed, that universities were running their own immigration policy undermining government policies. A series of more stringent access restrictions at universities and a ban for spouses followed in late 2025, taking effect in 2026.

=== Performance in primary school ===
On average, immigrant students have weaker performance levels in reading, math, and science than their Danish peers at the end of compulsory education When leaving primary school, in 2021 non-Western descendants received lower grades on average than pupils of Danish descent, in particular in mathematics and reading. The same difference was noted in the study "PISA Etnisk 2018" (PISA Ethnical 2018), a statistical study on pupils with immigrant background conducted as part of the general Programme for International Student Assessment (PISA) studies in Denmark. In 2018, 10.7% of all participating Danish school children had an immigrant background (i.e. both parents were born outside Denmark). These students on average achieved lower results concerning maths, reading and science subjects. Most of the difference was due to a differing socioeconomic background for the immigrants students. The PISA study also pointed out that the student composition of the school in question also was significant, so that the socioeconomic background of the student herself as well as the background of her class-mates would influence her school results.

In an earlier study, it was found that demographic characteristics such as the student's gender, number of siblings, language spoken at home, home education resources, the number of books in the home, parents' level of education, parents' income and occupation, and parents' labor market experience explained between 40 and 65% of the achievement gap between immigrant and native Dane test scores. In addition to the finding that student demographic characteristics concerning their family size, educational materials in the home, and their parents' socioeconomic status, the study found that schools with more than 10% immigrant students had greater achievement gaps between immigrant and descendant PISA scores and the scores of students of Danish origin. This indicates that school composition also has a significant effect on immigrant student achievement.

== Geographic dispersion ==
Danish immigrants tend to be concentrated in the most populous cities Copenhagen, Aarhus, Odense and Aalborg. In 2021, immigrants made up 16.2% of the population in the metropolitan area of Copenhagen, but only 7.6% of the population in rural municipalities. Preventing enclaves with a disproportionately high concentration of immigrants has been a growing concern in Denmark since the 1980s. In particular, certain social housing districts have a high proportion of non-western immigrants.

Denmark's first dispersal act was passed in 1986 and enforced the geographic dispersal of arriving refugee populations across the 13 Danish counties. The Integration Act of 1998 reassigned primary responsibility to find local housing for refugees and organize programs to introduce refugees to Danish society to municipalities. The 1998 legislation also tied immigrant introductory programs and welfare benefits to residing in their assigned municipality in order to discourage relocation.

Legislation to further promote integration of immigrant populations, titled "A Change for Everyone" was passed in May 2005. Part of the aim of this legislation was to further education and employment among immigrants and their descendants and to counter ghettoization in vulnerable neighborhoods. This act gave municipalities the right to deny housing to applicants on housing waiting lists that had received public benefits for 6 months or more in order to encourage unemployed immigrant populations to accept housing offers outside of areas with high concentrations of immigrants in an effort to diversify the composition of tenants in urban areas. This legislation aimed to balance housing waiting lists in cities such as Copenhagen with existing vacancies in geographic regions such as Jutland.

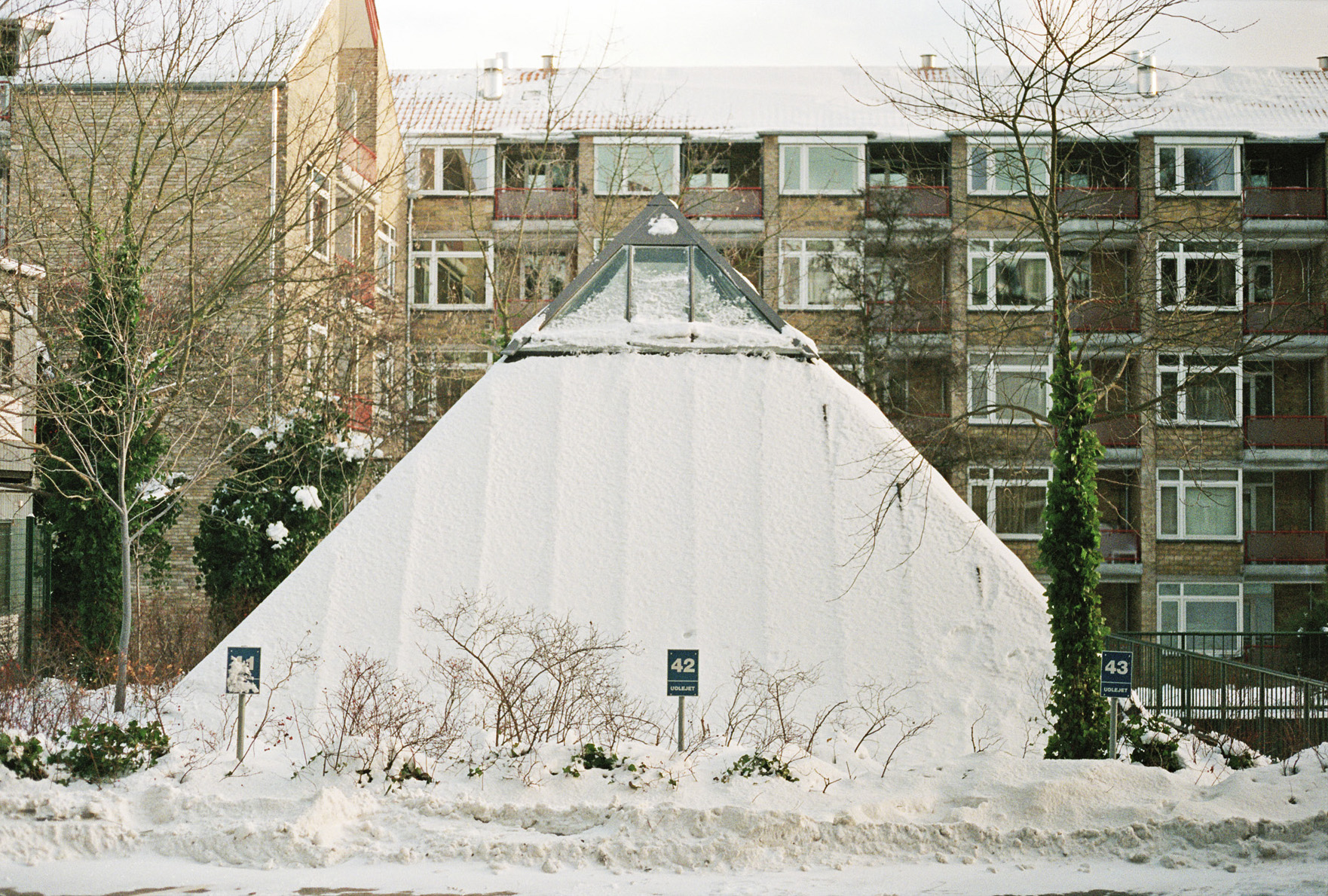
Bispeparken, Copenhagen - a neighborhood with many immigrants

In 2004, the government announced a "strategy against ghettoisation", and in the following years several other initiatives were directed specifically towards the prevailing patterns of settlements of non-western immigrants in some social housing areas. From 2010, the Danish government has published annual lists defining specific social housing areas as vulnerable based on a number of specific criteria such as unemployment rates, average income, educational levels, proportion of non-western immigrants and descendants, and crime rates. The criteria and naming of the housing areas have been changed several times. During the years 2015–2020, there was an officially named "ghetto list" for areas fulfilling certain criteria.

In 2018, the Lars Løkke Rasmussen III Cabinet published a proposal titled "Ét Danmark uden parallelsamfund - Ingen ghettoer i 2030" ("One Denmark without parallel societies - No ghettos by 2030"). Among the initiatives were demolishment of existing neighbourhoods, requiring daycare institutions to have a maximum share of 30% of their children from a "ghetto", and allowing police to designate areas as "skærpede strafzoner", such that certain crimes committed within them were to be punished more severely than crimes committed elsewhere.

The term "ghetto" was controversial, however, inhabitants feeling stigmatized by the wording and researchers pointing out that the areas in question were typically inhabited by 20-40 different ethnic minorities, hence being diametrically opposed to the ethnic homogeneity of the original ghettos, so that multi-ethnic residential areas would be a more appropriate term. After a change of government, the newly appointed minister of housing Kaare Dybvad stated in July 2019 that he would in future avoid using the word "ghetto". In 2021, the term was officially removed from the legislation. Henceforth, the official annual lists of vulnerable social housing residential areas consisted of four different types: "forebyggelsesområder" (prevention areas), "udsatte områder" (exposed areas), "parallelsamfund" (parallel societies) and "omdannelsesområder" (conversion areas).

As of January 2023, socalled "parallelsamfund" (parallel societies) are social housing areas of at least 1,000 inhabitants, of which more than 50% are non-western immigrants or descendants, and fulfilling at least two of the following four criteria:

- At least 30% of adults aged 18–64 are not working or in school
- At least twice as many residents as the national average have been convicted of a crime
- At least 60% of residents aged 30–59 have not been educated past primary school
- Average income of the residents of the area is less than 65% of the region's income average

As of 1 December 2022, there were 10 parallel societies defined in this way. The number had been declining consecutively since 2018, at which time there were 29 areas defined according to the same criteria.

== Economic impact of immigration ==
The cost of integrating Denmark's immigrant population both as socio-cultural and economic members of the Danish population has been used as a justification for the passage of increasingly stringent immigration and refugee policy. Recent numbers calculating the cost of immigration welfare benefits to the Danish economy are debated due to the number of complex factors involved. One 1997 report from the Ministry for Immigrants, Refugees and Immigration stated that the total cost of immigrants and their descendants to the state, taking into account their tax contributions as well, was 10 billion Danish Kroner. The following section explores the conceptual and numeric economic costs and gains that Denmark has experienced as its immigrant population has increased in recent years.

=== Public finances ===
According to the Danish Ministry of Finance, non-Western immigration received in benefits and public services 27 billion DKK more than they paid in taxes in 2019 (about €3.09 billion), down from 32 billion in 2018 (€4.29 billion) and 43 billion in 2016 (€5.77 billion). Since 2019, the employment rate of non-western immigrants has increased while benefits paid to the group decreased by a third between 2019 - 2022. Western immigrants and their descendants contributed 14 billion DKK in 2018 due to their high level of employment.

=== Employment ===
In the 1990s, Denmark was found to have the greatest gap between immigrant and native-born employment of all of the OECD countries. One study, published by the Think Tank on Integration in Denmark found

"The inadequate integration of foreigners in the labor market will cost the public sector some 23 billion Danish Kroner annually from the year 2005."

A 1996 study of positive and negative net transfers to and from the Danish Public Sector found that although immigrants contributed a positive transfer to the national public sector tax base, they posed a negative transfer at the county and municipal level as primarily recipients of rather than contributors to public sector benefits. Immigrants from non-western countries of origin posed the greatest cost to the public sector, with the smallest positive contribution when compared to native Dane and second generation immigrants at the state level and the largest cost at the county, municipal, and unemployment insurance levels of the public sector budget. The particularly high cost to municipalities can be explained in part by municipalities' responsibility to design and fund the integration of their resident immigrant populations. This same 1996 study found that the length of time immigrants live in Denmark can remediate some of these costs, with an increase in the number of years an immigrant lives in Denmark correlating a larger net contribution to the national, county, and municipal levels of the public sector. Despite this finding, the greater the number of years an immigrant lived in Denmark also correlated with a greater cost in unemployment insurance. A study published in 2003 found that in order for the net contribution of working age immigrants to meet their net costs to the public sector it would require 60% labor force participation within the population. Statistics such as these motivated the Danish government to pass the first Integration Act of 1999, which articulated labor market participation as a measurement of immigrant integration. During the first decades of the 21st century, the labor force participation rate for non-western immigrants rose from 52% in 2001 to 66% in 2021.

=== Social welfare ===
According to Statistics Denmark in 2020 citing 2019 figures, while non-Western immigrants constitute 8% of the population aged 16–54, they represent 11% of people receiving social welfare benefits and at 17% are particularly overrepresented as recipients of cash social welfare payments (Danish: kontanthjælpsmodtagere). Among all non-Western immigrants aged 16–64, a share of 37% are receiving social welfare where the correspondings shares for Danes are 27% and 17% for Western immigrants.

Immigrants from Western countries constitute 6% of the population and are underrepresented as social welfare recipients at a 4% share.

As of September 2025, 93% of the minimum rate receivers were non-Western immigrants.

=== Wages ===
Denmark does not have a nationally mandated minimum wage, rather trade unions regulate pay by lobbying for wage standards within their specific sectors. The strength of trade unions to influence wages relies upon their representation of the labor force and a lack of competition for lower wages. As immigration and free movement from European Union member countries have increased, trade unions and economic experts have speculated that an increase in workers outside of trade unions, especially in the unskilled labor market, will lead to a weakening of labor union bargaining power and a drop in native Danes' wages.

=== Pension ===
Many scholars have identified the influx of a younger immigrant population as a posing a possible economic benefit to the aging Danish population and its declining fertility by contributing to the tax base as a growing number of native Danes reach retirement age and collect their state pensions. This issue remains contested, however, due to the low rates of employment among immigrant populations with some scholars suggesting that the best solution to counter the aging Danish population coupled with the economic burdens of immigrants on the public sector would be longer labor market participation through an increase in retirement age.

== Crime ==
Immigrants and men and women of immigrant descent in Denmark are over-represented in crime statistics. A study of crime statistics from 1990 to 2001 found greater proportion of non-Western immigrant and descendant populations are convicted of committing a crime than Western immigrants and descendants and their Danish peers. The same study suggested that descendants of immigrants were found to have a slightly higher crime rate than immigrant populations.

Crime index of males in Denmark by country of origin

Studies have found that the types of crime that Danish nationals and immigrants and their descendants are found guilty of committing differ. A study of crime by country of origin from 1995 to 2000 found that Danes are more likely to violate the Road Traffic Act, whereas immigrants and descendants have a higher proportion of convictions for property violations and crimes of violence than Danes.

The incidence of crime within male second-generation populations of non-Western descent has been rising, with more than a 60% increase in crimes committed by members of this demographic group between 2007 and 2012. This growing crime rate has put pressure on politicians to design new legislature to deter criminal activity. In February 2014, the Danish Minister of Justice suggested that child support be cut to immigrant families with youth found guilty of a crime. Currently, an immigrant convicted of a serious crime is excluded from obtaining right to permanent residence.

Immigration and integration scholars have noted that differences in crime between native-born citizens and immigrants and their descendants may indicate a lack of agreement with common societal rules and norms and therefore an indication of poor integration of foreigners into the greater population. Other explanations for the higher rates of arrest and conviction rates for immigrants have been the age demographic differences, Islam, different crime patterns, different confessional patterns, and ethnic profiling by law enforcement officials. Involvement in criminal activity has been linked to age and the foreign-born population of Denmark includes a greater proportion of adolescents than the Danish population. The types of crimes committed may impact arrest and sentencing, and as the previously mentioned study pointed out, differences exist in the types of crime committed by demographic groups. A willingness to confess has been linked to dropped charges and acquittals. Two studies comparing the confession patterns of Danish and foreign born individuals found that individuals of a Danish background were twice as likely to confess to criminal charges than those of an immigrant background. Finally, a qualitative study of Danish police indicated that the ethnicity of an individual was a factor in police's stop-and-search procedure, indicating that the number of arrests of immigrants and ethnic minority citizens in Denmark may be inflated due to a greater suspicion of the criminal actions of such individuals.

Danish national police reported in 2012 that conviction rates per 1000 residents in Denmark were: 12.9 for Danish citizens, 114.4 for Somali citizens and 54.3 for citizens of other countries.

According to a 2015 report by Statistics Denmark, men born abroad had a 43% higher crime rate compared to the average of all men in Denmark. The highest rates were recorded from males from Lebanon, Somalia, Morocco, Syria and Pakistan. For male descendants of non-Western immigrants, the discrepancy was greater at 144%.

According to the 2016 report by Statistics Denmark, the crime rate of non-Western male migrants was about three times that of the male population in Denmark. When correction for the greater proportion youth among non-Western migrants are taken into account and is adjusted for, the crime rate was two and half times that of the general male population. Male immigrants and male descendants from EU countries were among males with the lowest crime rate. When corrected for age, male immigrants from Germany, Sweden, Italy and the United Kingdom crime indices of less than half (43-48%) the average of all males in Denmark. Descendants from nearly all countries showed an over-representation, except descendants with roots in Iceland, Sri Lanka and Vietnam. Syrian male descendants stand out where their crime rate is three times that of Syrian immigrants.

At 4%, male migrants aged 15–64 with non-Western backgrounds had twice the conviction rate against the Danish Penal Code in 2018, compared to 2% for Danish men. In a given year, about 13% of all male descendants of non-Western migrants aged 17–24 are convicted against the penal code.

In the 2018–2020 period, 83 people were denied Danish citizenship because they had committed serious crime. Among those were people who had received court sentences for gang crime, violence against children and sexual offenses. People who have received a prison sentence of at least one year are barred from receiving citizenship, along with people who have received a prison sentence of at least three months for a crime against a person.

In April 2021, the Mette Frederiksen Cabinet approved regulation which stops awarding citizenship to foreigners who had received a prison sentence in court which also encompassed suspended prison sentences. Previously, awarding citizenship was possible for foreigners with a prison sentence of less than a year.

Denmark's register-based updates to the Folketing on the 321 Palestinians admitted under Law No. 144/1992 show that as of 1 Jan 2024, 266 of the original cohort reside in Denmark and 230 hold Danish citizenship; in 2023, 170 were full-time benefit recipients, including 130 on early or senior pension. Across 1992–2023 the cohort's cumulative convictions, counted by highest sanction, were 39 unconditional prison, 33 conditional prison, and 137 fines or other sanctions; minor traffic fines under DKK 1,500 are excluded. Earlier snapshots reported 185 full-time benefit recipients in 2009 and 189 in 2016, with conviction totals of 63 prison and 114 fines by 2009, and 67 prison and 137 fines/other by 2016. For descendants, at end-2019 there were 999 children in Denmark; for 1992–2019, 337 had convictions (65 unconditional, 67 conditional, 183 fines, 22 other), and in 2019 there were 372 full-time benefit recipients, more than half on SU.

According to the publication from Statistics Denmark 'Indvandrere i Danmark 2025', male descendants from Lebanon, Somalia, Syria and Iraq are 2-4 times as likely to commit crimes as the general population.

=== Prisoner population ===
In 2021, 31.1% of the prisoners in Denmark had foreign background and 15.5% were foreign-born. The total number of prisoners of foreign background was 3,239, of which 1,521 were from Asia, 710 from Africa, 685 from European countries not part of the EU, 286 from EU countries, 24 from South America and 4 from North America. The most common nationalities of people with foreign background were Lebanese (423), followed by Turks (356), Somalis (323), Iraqis (246) and Syrians (177).

According to statistics collected in November 2018 non-Danish immigrants constituted 44.3% of the prison population where 13.5% were foreigners, 16.5% were immigrants and 14.2% were descendants of immigrants. In Copenhagen prisons the share was higher at 66.3%.

== Language ==
In 1973, the first policy regarding immigrant language acquisition was enacted. This law required all foreign workers in Denmark to complete 40 hours of language instruction within a month of their arrival in Denmark. The Ministry of Social Affairs expanded this requirement in 1975 from 40 hours to 180 hours of language instruction accompanied by 40 hours of courses to introduce workers to norms of Danish society. Today, all applicants for permanent residency in Denmark must sign a Declaration on Integration and Active Citizenship in Danish Society which includes the following provision:

"I understand and accept that the Danish language and knowledge of the Danish society is the key to a good and active life in Denmark. I will therefore do my best to learn Danish and acquire knowledge about the Danish society as soon as possible. I understand and accept that I can learn Danish by attending Danish classes offered to me by the district council."

Immigrants that have been granted residence permits based on family reunification are required to pass a Danish language test within six months of the date they registered at the National Register of Persons. Reunified spouses benefit from passing an optional second level of the language test, which upon passing, will reduce the amount of monetary collateral their partner has to provide as a requirement of their reunification.

Until 2006, Danish immigrant pupils had the privilege to receive instruction of their mother tongue. This practice was discontinued as it was found in a study of 450 immigrant pupils that such instruction did not improve test scores in numeracy or literacy in the PISA tests.

== See also ==
- Opposition to immigration
- Remigration
- 2025 UK refugee plan
