= Christian Danneskiold-Samsøe =

Christian Danneskiold-Samsøe may refer to:

- Christian Danneskiold-Samsøe (Danish nobleman, born 1774) (1774–1823), Danish councillor, landowner and magistrate
- Christian Danneskiold-Samsøe (Danish nobleman, born 1836) (1836–1908), Danish landowner and director of the Royal Danish Theatre, grandson of the above
