= Muuss =

Muuss is a surname. Notable people with the surname include:

- Bobby Muuss (born 1976), American college soccer coach
- Mike Muuss (1958–2000), American computer programmer
- Rolf Muuss (1924–2020), German-American psychologist and academic

== See also ==
- Muus
