= Jørgen Wichfeld =

Danish judge (1729–1797)

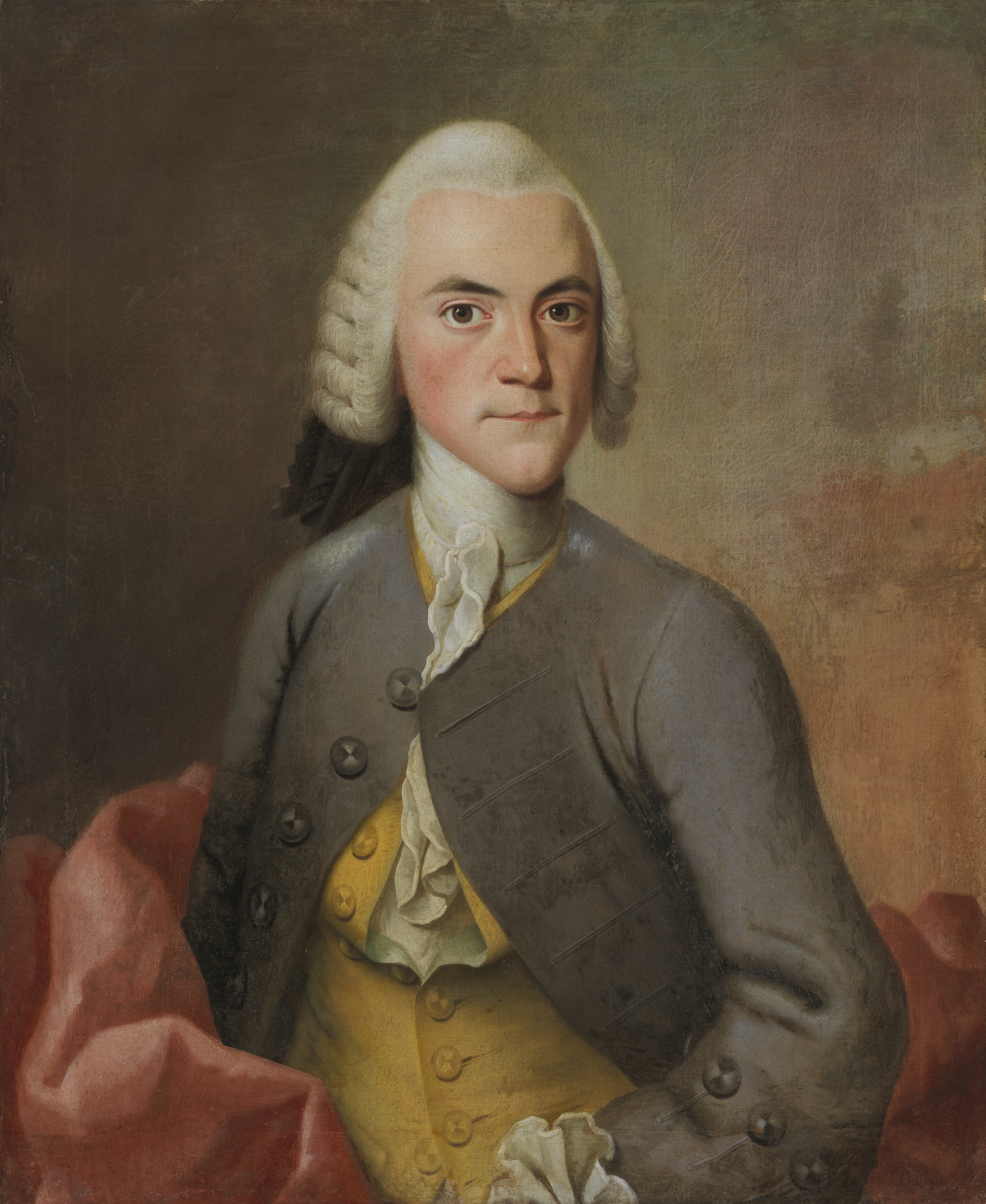
- Born: 1 July 1729; Engestofte, Denmark
- Died: 19 December 1797 (aged 68); Engestofte, Denmark
- Occupations: Landowner and industrialist

Jørgen Wichfeld (born Jørgen Wichmand, 1 July 1729 – 19 December 1797) was a Danish landowner, industrialist and deputy district judge from Lolland-Falster.

He was ennobled by letters patent on 23 July 1777, creating the Wichfeld noble family. He owned Engestofte and Ulriksdal on Lolland. From 1774 to 1787 he also owned Nordfeld on Møn.

== Biography ==
Jørgen Wichmand was born at Engestofte in the island of Lolland as the oldest of two sons of Bertel Wichmand (1677–1732) and Bodil Cathrine Wichmand née From (died 1760). His father was a wealthy merchant from Nykøbing Falster who had acquired the estate on which his son was born in 1727.

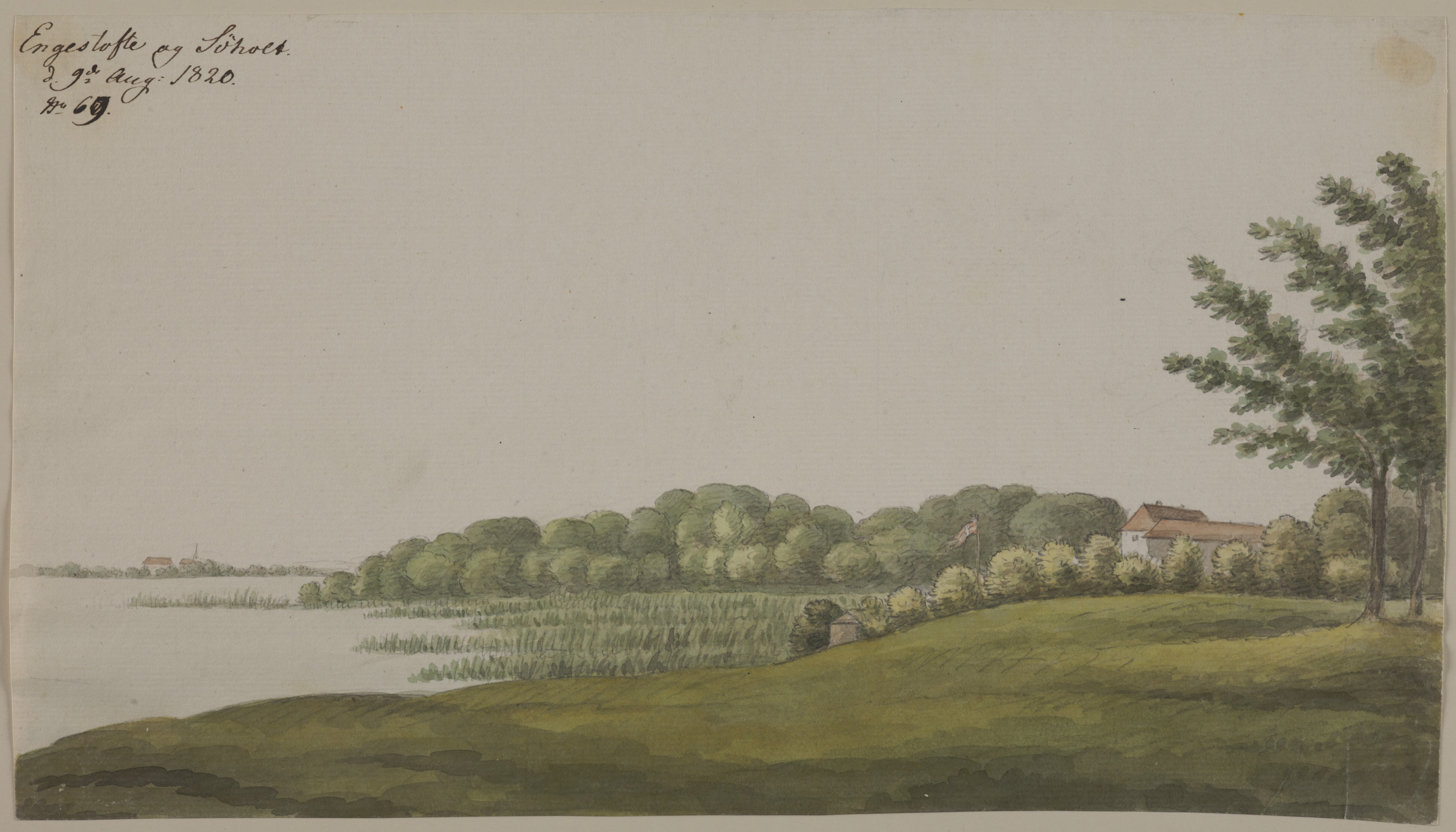
Illustration of Engestofte from 1820

Wichmand took over Engestofte after his mother's death in 1760. He expanded his holdings by acquiring Ulriksdal (Lolland) in 1766. In 1770, he obtained a royal license to open a starch and cosmetic powder factory at Engestofte. He bought Nordfeld on Møn at auction in 1774 but sold it again in 1787.

He was a deputy district judge at the landsting in Lolland-Falster from 1769–1787 and was appointed to the etatsråd in 1779. Wichmand and his older brother, Thomas Frederik Wichmand, were ennobled by letters patent with the name Wichfeld on 23 July 1777.

== Legacy ==
Jørge Wischfeld died on 17 December 1797 at Engestofte. He was buried at the Engestofte Kirke, which he had funded the expansion of in 1786. Wichfeld never married and had no children. He left his two estates to his nephew, Henning Wichfeld, with an obligation to turn them into a stamhus (family foundation). Henning did so on 8 November 1799.
