= Ellen Louise Mertz =

Danish geologist

- Born: 20 July 1896; Engestofte, Lolland
- Died: 29 December 1987 (aged 91); Ordrup, Zealand
- Education: Polytechnic School, Copenhagen
- Occupation: engineering geologist
- Notable work: contribution to the Little Belt Bridge

Ellen Louise Mertz (20 July 1896 – 29 December 1987) was one of Denmark's first female geologists and the country's first engineering geologist. She undertook pioneering investigative work for the Danish State Railways in the late 1920s in connection with the construction of the Little Belt Bridge (completed in 1929) and was the first to propose what later became the Danish Geotechnical Institute.

== Biography ==
Mertz was born on the Engestofte estate on the island of Lolland where her father, Ludvig Olsen (1861–1928), was the estate manager. In her late teens, she served an apprenticeship on a farm in the north of Jutland, but in fact she aspired to become an engineer. In 1916, she entered the Polytechnic School in Copenhagen, completing the first stage of her civil engineering course in 1919. As she had spent some time undertaking laboratory work for Geological Survey of Denmark (Danmarks Geologiske Undersøgelse: DGU), Victor Madsen, the director, advised her to study geology. As a result, although she did not complete a recognized course of study, she was able to participate constructively in the development of engineering geology.

While on a study trip to Stockholm in 1921, Mertz became acquainted with the field of geotechnical investigation, a completely new concept for Denmark. Its development had resulted from collaboration between engineers and geologists after a Swedish dam had collapsed in 1914. Together, the experts were able to come up with proposals for preventing such disasters in the future. Although their final report was not published until 1922, Mertz was able to benefit from their work. On her return to Denmark, she promoted collaboration between the Danish State Railways and the Geological Survey. As a result, in the late 1920s she was charged to undertake a geological study as a basis for the construction of the Little Belt Bridge.

In 1930, the Geological Survey and the Danish Railways established a geotechnical laboratory in which Mertz and a railway engineer collaborated, especially on bridge building investigations. From the start, Mertz participated in feasibility studies on a total of eight bridges, all of which were completed in the 1930s. Her initiatives led to the creation of the Geotechnical Survey of Denmark in 1943. It was located in the Danish Railways' administrative building in Copenhagen and was established under the authority of the Academy of Technical Sciences. She continued to work in her geotechnical laboratory until 1969 while maintaining close contacts with the Geotechnical Survey and its staff.

In 1958, she was appointed departmental geologist at the Geotechnical Survey. Collaboration between geologists and engineers led to the creation of a new branch of science, engineering geology. Mertz, a pioneer in the field, became known in Scandinavia as the "Mother of Engineering Geology". She promoted the new field through lectures and courses at the Technical High School and similar institutions.

== Awards ==
For her contributions to geology, Mertz received the following awards:

- 1966: The Order of Dannebrog
- 1974: the Technical University's gold medal

== Selected publications ==
Among her publications, Mertz compiled a series of nine studies on the geological conditions of the towns of Denmark beginning with Helsingør in 1969 and culminating with Korsør in 1985.

- Mertz, Ellen Louise; Bertelsen, Ole (1949). Danmarks geologiske undersøgelse. C.A. Reitzel.
- Mertz, Ellen Louise (1969). Helsingør og omegns jordbundsforhold. En ingeniør-geologisk beskrivelse. C.A. Reitzel.
- Mertz, Ellen Louise (1970). Hillerød og omegns jordbundsforhold: En ingeniørgeologisk beskrivelse. C.A. Reitzel.
- Mertz, Ellen Louise (1985). Korsør og omegns jordbundsforhold. Danmarks Geologiske Undersøgelse.

== Literature ==
- Bahnson, Henner; Frederiksen, John F. (1989). Ellen Louise Mertz : 20.7.1896-29.12.1987 : nekrolog samt foredrag holdt ved en mindeaften i Geoteknisk Forening (in Danish). Geografforlaget. ISBN 87-88640-35-3.
