= Varinka Wichfeld Muus =

Danish resistance fighter (1922–2002)

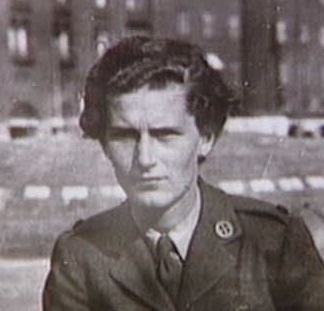
Varinka Wichfeld Muus

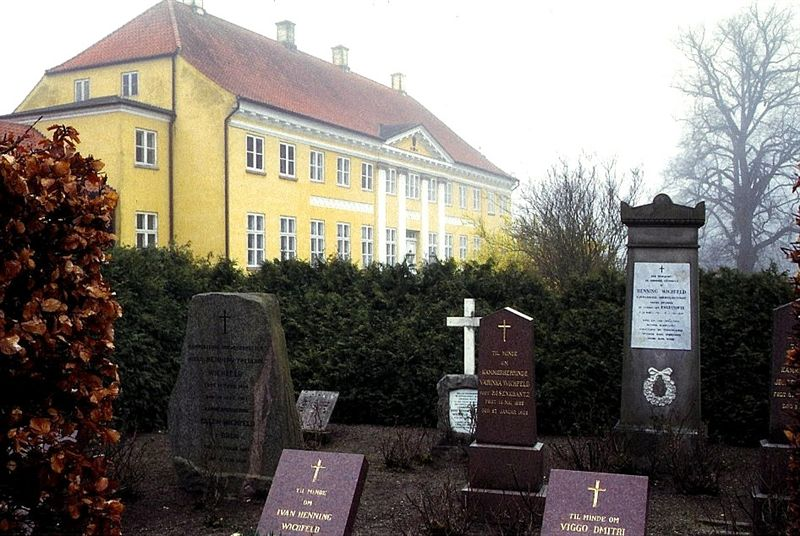
Engestofte Manor, Wichfeld's birthplace

Varinka Corinna Wichfeld Muus (9 February 1922 – 18 December 2002) was a Danish resistance fighter under the German occupation of Denmark in World War II. Her mother was Monica Wichfeld, an upper-class Ulsterwoman who was a leading member of the Danish resistance during the German occupation of Denmark and was the first woman in Denmark to receive a capital sentence for resistance against the Nazis. In 1943, Varinka became the secretary of her husband-to-be, Flemming Muus, who acted as chief agent in Denmark for the British Special Operations Executive (SOE). When Muus was forced to move to Sweden, Wichfeld was charged with telegraphing messages to London as only she knew the secret codes. Together with Muus, she moved to London in 1944 where they remained until the end of the war.

== Early life ==
Varinka Corinna Wichfeld was born on 9 February 1922 in the Engestofte manor house near Maribo on the island of Lolland; she was the second of the three children of the Danish aristocrat and diplomat Jørgen Adalbert Wichfeld (1885–1966) and his wife, Monica Emily Massy-Beresford (1894–1945), who had been raised in Ulster in the north of Ireland. Also known as 'Inkie', as a small child Varinka was brought up in the manor house. Thanks to periods spent with her family in England, France, Austria and Ireland, she became fluent in several languages. From 1929 to 1941, she lived with her family in Italy, mainly in Rapallo. Both she and her mother initially supported Mussolini as they had come into contact with Francoist refugees but they soon turned against fascism. In April 1940, on hearing of the German occupation of Denmark while in Florence, Wichfeld suddenly developed feelings of Danish patriotism.

== Second World War ==
On returning to Denmark in late 1941, they both joined the resistance movement. Wichfeld was involved in distributing illegal magazines, helping fugitives and hiding explosives on the estate, while after meeting Flemming Muus her mother planned resistance activities in the Lolland-Falster region. In July 1943, Wichfeld was sent to Copenhagen by her mother to inform Muus of developments. It was then that Muus decided she should become his future wife and engaged her as his secretary.

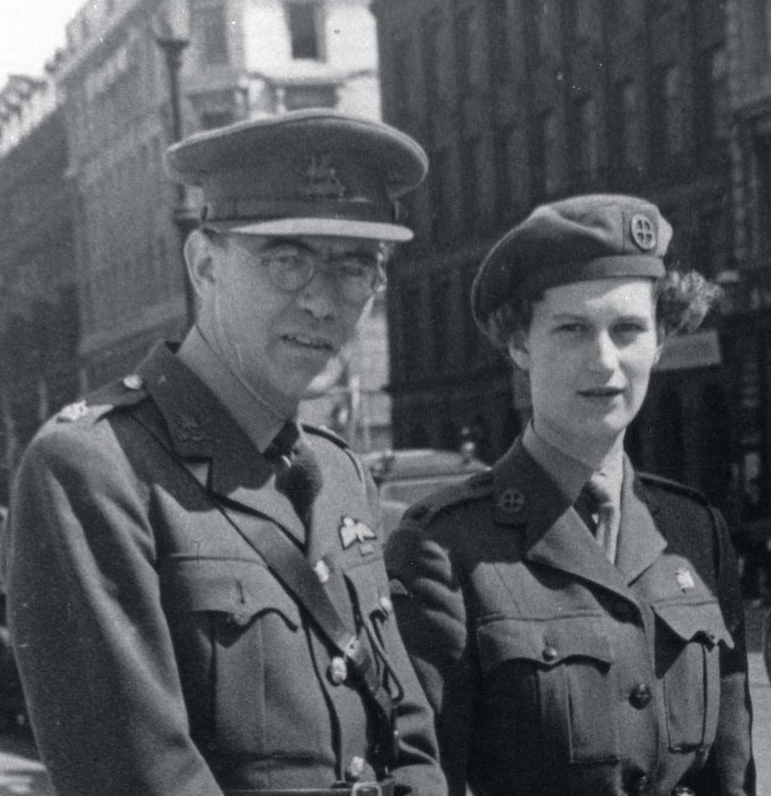
Wichfeld and her husband Flemming Muus c.1945

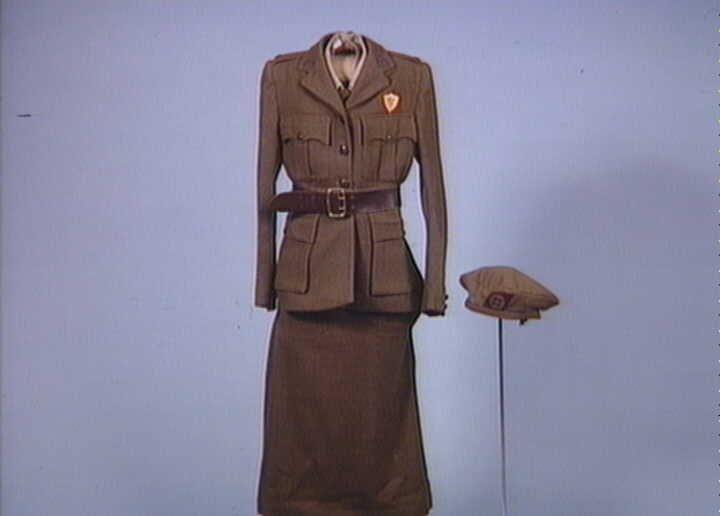
Wichfeld Muus' British uniform in Frihedsmuseet, Copenhagen.

In January 1944, Wichfeld learnt that the Gestapo had arrested her family at the Engestofte manor house. Realizing that she was also in danger of being arrested, she informed Muus that she intended to leave for neutral Sweden but he refused, explaining that her services were vital. She dyed her hair, dressed differently, wore spectacles and acquired new identity cards.

In May 1944, Wichfeld learnt that her mother had been sentenced to death by the Gestapo and that shortly afterwards she had been pardoned and sent to Germany. She married Muus in June but soon they were both in imminent danger of being arrested. Muus moved to Sweden but left his wife in Denmark to keep telegraphing messages to London as she knew all the secret codes.

In December 1944, both Varinka and her husband were called to London, where they remained until the end of the war. Varinka Wichfeld Muss joined the First Aid Nursing Yeomanry (SOE FANY) and became a lieutenant. Her FANY uniform is in the Museum of Resistance in Copenhagen.

== Post war ==
After the war, they both returned to Denmark, where Muus was attached to the British Military Mission while his wife worked as his driver and secretary. They went through a rough period after Muus was sentenced to imprisonment for embezzlement in 1946 but was later pardoned. After spending some time in South Africa, the couple returned to Denmark, where they both worked on a biography of Monica Wichfeld. Published by Arco in 1955, the English translation was titled Monica Wichfeld, a Very Gallant Woman.

Varinka Wichfeld Muus died on 18 December 2002 in Copenhagen. She is buried in Søllerød Cemetery.
