= Monica Wichfeld =

Danish resistance fighter

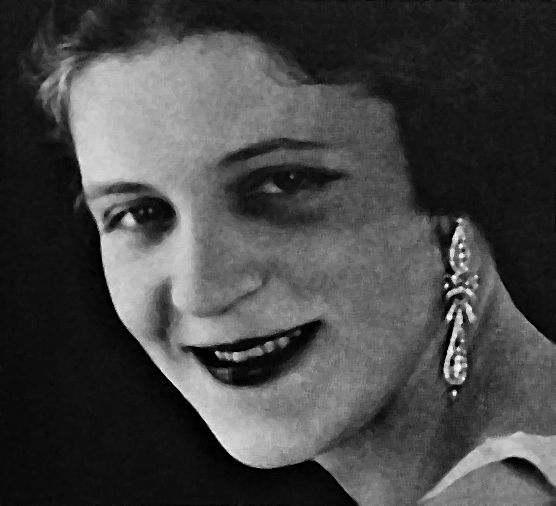
- Born: Monica Emily Massy-Beresford; 12 July 1894; Belgravia, London, England; raised in County Fermanagh
- Died: 27 February 1945 (aged 50); Waldheim Prison, Waldheim, Nazi Germany
- Occupations: Entrepreneur, resistance fighter
- Parent(s): John George Beresford Massy-Beresford, Hon. Alice Elizabeth, Mulholland
- Relatives: Grandfather: The 1st Baron Dunleath; Children: Ivan Wichfeld, Varinka Wichfeld Muus, and Viggo Wichfeld

Monica Emily Wichfeld (née Massy-Beresford; 12 July 1894 – 27 February 1945) was a leading member of the Danish resistance during the German occupation of Denmark in the Second World War. She was the first woman in Denmark to receive a capital sentence for resistance against the Nazis, but argued for its commutation to imprisonment.

== Early life ==
Wichfeld was born to Irish parents at 7 Eaton Square in Belgravia in London and was raised at St. Hubert's, a large Victorian house in the townland of Geaglum, very near the villages of Derrylin and Teemore, in the south of County Fermanagh in the south-west of Ulster. St. Hubert's was on the western shores of Upper Lough Erne, being only a short distance (by boat) north of Crom Castle. She was born into a wealthy land-owning Church of Ireland family of mixed Anglo-Irish and Ulster Scots descent, her father being John George Massy-Beresford (1856-1923) and her mother being the Hon. Alice Elizabeth Mulholland (1869-1948), a daughter of the prominent Ulster businessman the 1st Baron Dunleath. Her brother was Brigadier Tim Massy-Beresford (1896-1987) She was involved in the Ulster Volunteer Force (UVF) during the Home Rule Crisis in Ireland, and participated in the illegal distribution of firearms associated with the SS Clyde Valley Larne gun-running operation in April 1914, which was led by Major Fred Crawford. Wichfeld's favourite brother, Lieutenant John Clarina Massy-Beresford, served with the Royal Field Artillery (RFA) during the First World War and was killed in action in 1918 at the age of 21. After this event, Wichfeld was reported to have harboured a personal hatred of the Germans.

== Marriage ==
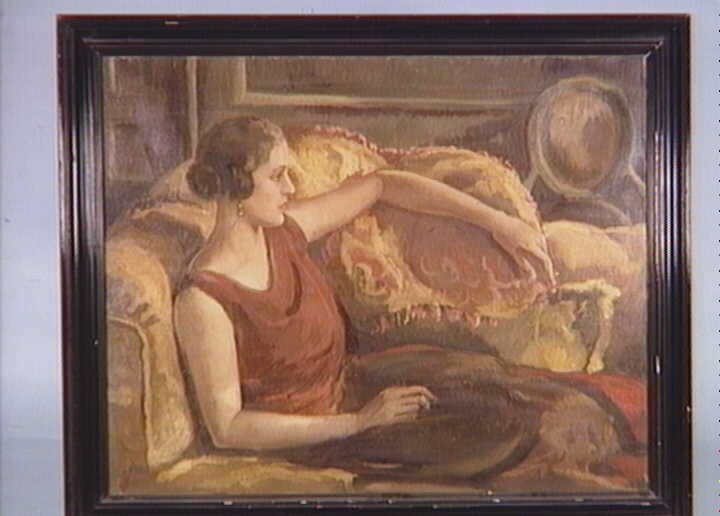
Portrait of Monica Wichfeld in the National Museum of Denmark

On 15 June 1916, she married Danish aristocrat and diplomat Jørgen Adalbert Wichfeld (16 August 1885 - 30 July 1966), the Secretary of the Danish Legation to London. Wichfeld and her husband moved to his Engestofte Estate near Maribo on the island of Lolland in Denmark, where she became a Danish citizen and had three children: Ivan (1919), Varinka (1922) and Viggo (1924). During this time, she became the friend and lover of Kurt Heinrich Eberhard Erdmann Georg, Greve (Count) von Haugwitz-Hardenberg-Reventlow, who lived in neighbouring Hardenberg Manor. The relationship with Greve von Reventlow continued for nine years. Jørgen Wichfield was aware of the relationship and unconcerned with it, naming Reventlow as daughter Varinka's godfather. When the relationship ended, Reventlow went on to marry Barbara Hutton.

The 1920s Danish tax reforms created a decline in the family's financial status, and the Wichfelds moved to Campo dei Fiori, a house owned by Wichfeld's mother in Rapallo on the Italian Riviera. Wichfeld travelled widely in Europe during this time and socialized with many notable people of the era, including Noël Coward, Clementine Churchill and Tallulah Bankhead. As The Great Depression came to Europe, the family fell further in decline, and Wichfeld took matters into her own hands. She moved alone to Paris to develop a line of beauty products, including a Coco Chanel-based essence, a fingernail protectant called No-Crax, as well as a profitable line of costume jewellery which reinvigorated the family's financial standing.

== Danish Resistance during the Second World War ==
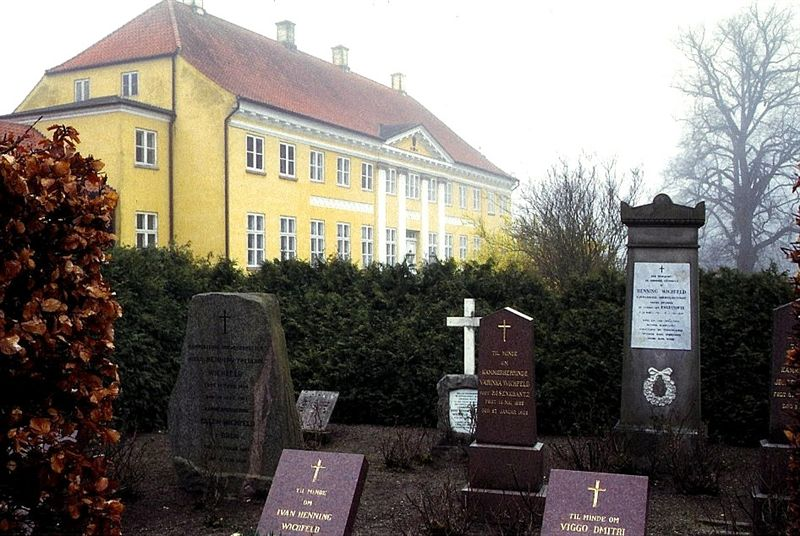
Engestofte Estate with the private Wichfeld family burial plot in the foreground

After the outbreak of the Second World War, Wichfeld's family was forced to leave the Kingdom of Italy when Mussolini ordered British citizens to leave the country in 1941. She returned to Engestofte in Denmark, and began to actively seek out supporters of the Danish resistance. In the summer of 1942 she rented a cottage at Engestofte to journalist Hilmar Wulff and his new wife, teacher Karen Inga Petersen along with dissident poet Halfdan Rasmussen. All three were members of the Danish Communist Party and Wulff was the editor of two underground newspapers Free Denmark (Frit Denmark) and Land and People (Land og Folk). Wichfeld began to drum up funds to feed the production and distribution of the papers, and to fund the underground activities of the Communist Party. Later that year, in a new partnership with Erik Kiersgaard, a member of the resistance who had organized a sabotage unit, Wichfeld began to store firearms, ammunition and explosives at Engestofte to support their cause.

Through Count Carl-Adam "Bobby" Moltke, the son of a former Danish Foreign Affairs minister and deeply connected member of the political underground of Copenhagen, Wichfeld met Flemming Muus, a man that had trained under Winston Churchill's Special Operations Executive (SOE), and would eventually become her son-in-law. Wichfeld made her estate available to Muus to house the top-secret SOE agent Jens Jacob Jensen, codenamed "Jacob" and shelter him. Eventually she and Jacob grew to lead the Lolland resistance and Engestofte became central to the recruitment, training, arming, planning, direction and organization of the actions of the resistance (such as the bombing of the Naskov shipyard), as well as being a receiving ground for British paratroopers and weapons drops. When the resistance gained momentum and the Nazis sent in forces to quell it, Wichfeld was instrumental in facilitating the escape of Danish patriots fleeing the country, including Himar Wulff and his wife. During this time, she also challenged the Danish resistance, who was reticent to facilitate safe passage for Jewish families, and personally began to harbour a Jewish family being sought by the Gestapo.

== Arrest, imprisonment and death ==
In late 1942 telephone transmissions between Jacob and other resistance members were intercepted by Gestapo wiretaps and led to the arrest of Jacob in Århus. Under interrogation and torture, Jacob gave away the names of forty-four resistance fighters and a hundred Danish families working with them. Wichfeld was one of them. Despite having received rumours that the Gestapo had evidence against her and would be coming to arrest her, Wichfield refused to leave Engestofte saying "I have joined the struggle for Denmark. I am willing to pay the price." In January 1944, she was arrested at Engestofte and imprisoned in Copenhagen's Vestre Fængsel prison where she was subjected to daily interrogation for four months. The resistance did mount a rescue plan that involved bribing a Gestapo agent to help facilitate her escape with a staged ambush, but the agent bungled the plan by getting drunk and having himself revealed. The Gestapo staged the transfer of an agent disguised as Wichfeld to try and capture the resistance ambush team that included her daughter Varinka and Flemming Muus, but the team recognized the agent as a decoy and did not attack.

In May 1944, Wichfeld stood trial with ten other defendants in the resistance. Together with Georg Quistgaard and two others, she was sentenced to death but was told she could beg clemency to have it commuted to a life sentence. She asked the court if the same offer extended to the other defendants, and when it was not, turned it down flatly, and then sat down and casually powdered her nose.

There was outrage across the country at her sentence, as capital punishment for women had long since been considered barbaric in Denmark. The sentence was later converted into a life sentence, and because there was no penal servitude for women in Denmark, she was transferred with other women captured as part of the resistance Hvidsten group to Cottbus POW camp in Germany, and eventually transferred to Waldheim Prison. She died there of pneumonia on 27 February 1945 after a long bout of tuberculosis, one month before the end of the Second World War.

== Commemoration ==
Wichfeld is listed on the memorial wall in Ryvangen Memorial Park indicating that the whereabouts of her remains are unknown.

The Ulster History Circle unveiled a blue plaque in her memory at Kinawley and Holy Trinity Parish Church in Derrylin in November 2023, close to her childhood home, St. Hubert's, on the shores of Upper Lough Erne.

== See also ==
- Danish resistance movement
