= Nordfeld =

Manor house on the island of Møn, Denmark

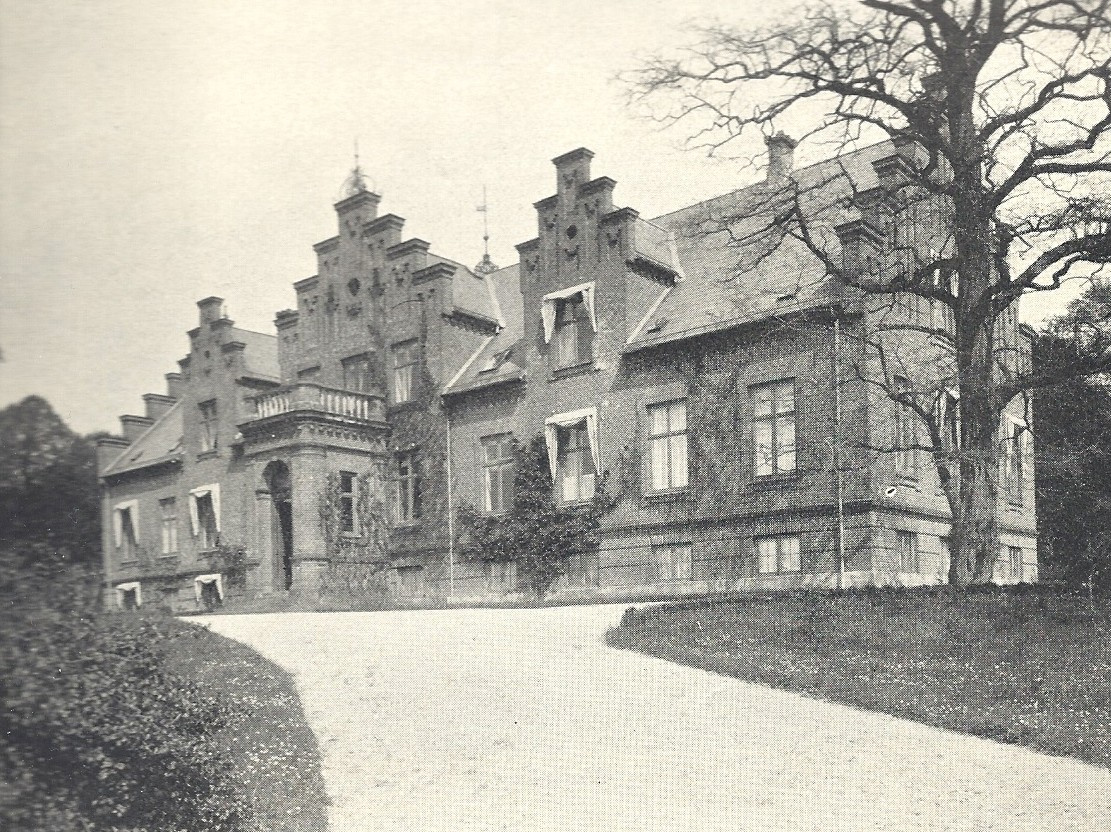
- The main building seen on a vintage postcard
- Interactive map of the Nordfeld area

General information
- Architectural style: Gothic Revival
- Location: Møn, Denmark
- Coordinates: 55°1′14″N 12°23′40″E
- Completed: 1774(first main building); 1876 (current main building)
- Client: Otto Danneskjold-Samsøe

Design and construction
- Architect: Frederik Wilsbech (current main building)

Nordfeld is a manor house on the island of Møn in southeastern Denmark. The estate was created in 1774 but the current, Neo-Gothic main building is from 1876.

== History ==
=== Origins ===
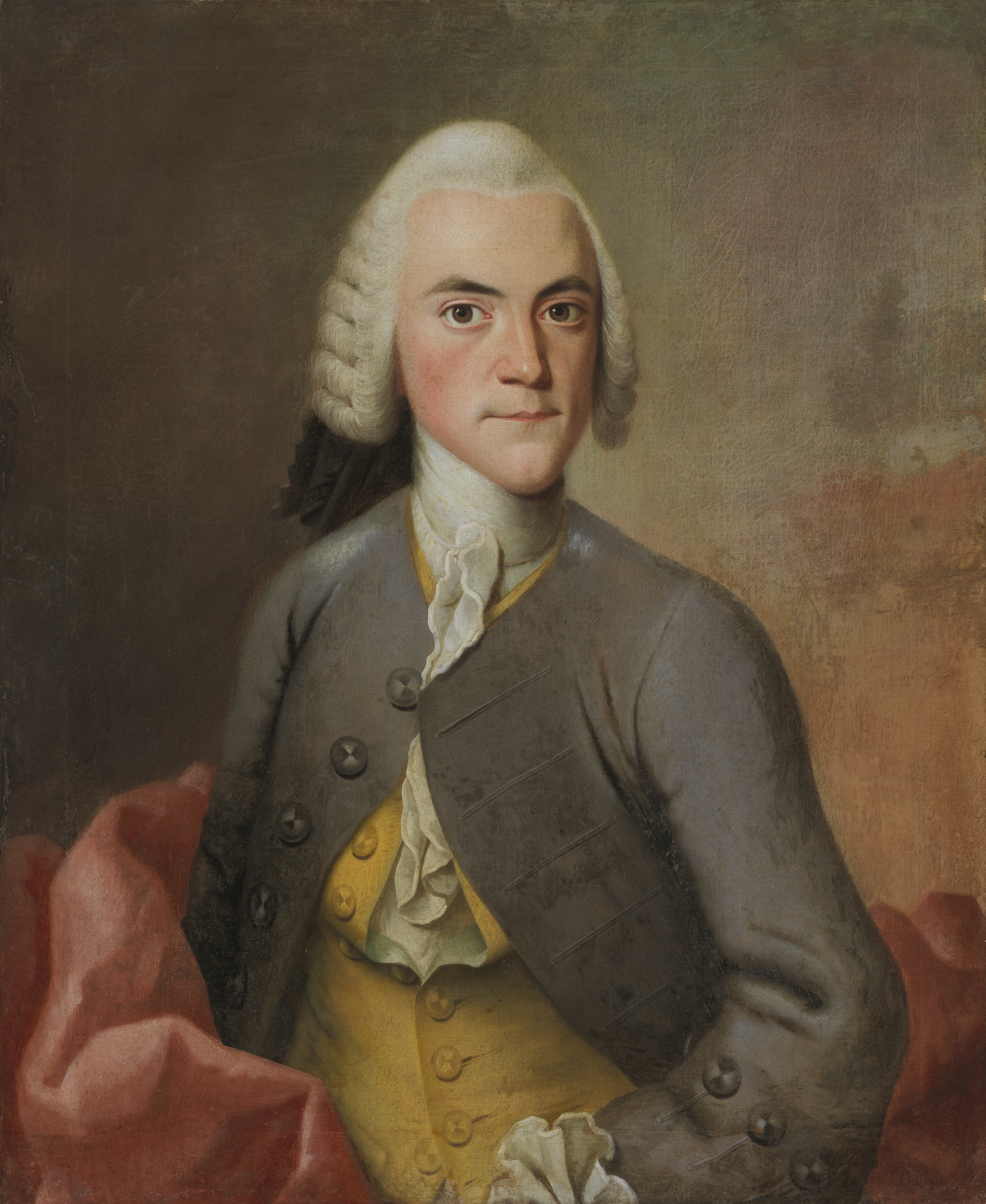
Jørgen Wichfeld

The entire island of Møn was up until the second half of the 18th century crown land. Nordfeld is one of many manor houses in eastern Denmark that was created when Frederick V and later Christian VII began to sell off crown land as part of the agricultural reforms of the time. The intention was to sell the land to the local tenant farmers but Count Conrad Holck and Tyge Thygesen, who were put in charge of the sale, were opposed to the reforms. They divided Møn into five large estates which were sold at auction in 1770. The local farmers showed up in large numbers at the auction to buy the entire island but only managed to buy three of the estates due to a requirement that guarantees for the payment should be provided the following morning at 10 am at the latest. Nordfeld was therefore not sold until a new auction was held in March 1774. The buyer was Jørgen Wichfeld. He immediately constructed a new manor house on the land.

=== Peder Sølling and Christopher Schøller Bülow ===
Christoffer Wilhelm Eckersberg:Scene from Nordfeldt Manor on Møn

In 1787, Wichfeld sold Nordfeld to Peder Sølling. He sold many of the farms to the tenant farmers as freeholds.

In 1806, Sølling sold Nordfeld to Christopher Schøller Bülow. In 1802, he had become an official (deputeret) in Danske Kancelli. Prior to buying Nordfeld, he had also bought Tybjerggaard and Gyldenholm on Zealand. During the economic crisis, he was hit by economic difficulties. In 1818, he was suspended from his public duties after entering bankruptcy proceedings. In 1820, he was prosecuted for embezzlement with public funds. In 1821, he was sentenced to prison until he repaid the defrauded sums and deprived of rank and noble rights. He fled before imprisonment to Hamburg, where he died in 1830

=== The Danneskiold-Samsøe family ===
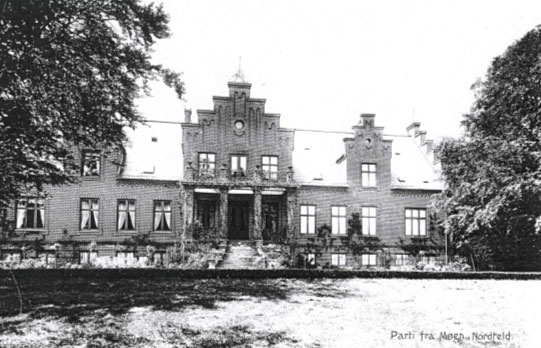
The new main building from 1876

In 1820, Nordfeld was sold to Christian Conrad, Count of Danneskiold-Samsøe. In 1823, he passed it on to his youngest son, Otto Danneskiold-Samsøe, who was director of the Royal Danish Mail Services. He constructed a new main building.

After Otto Danneskiold-Samsøe's death in 1894, Nordfeld was passed on to his son Christian Conrad Sophus Danneskiold-Samsøe. Later in the same year, he was appointed to director of the Royal Danish Theatre. On his death in 1908, Nordfeld was passed down first to his widow Wanda Danneskiold-Samsøe and then his son Viggo Danneskiold-Samsøe.

=== Krarup/Haubroe family ===
In 1930, Nordfeld was acquired by J.S. Krarup. In 1930, it passed to his daughter Kirsten Haubroe (née Krarup). She owned it until 1990.

In 1990, Nordfeld passed to Jens Krarup Haubroe. In 2024, he sold it for DKK 114 million to his daughter Kirstine Hvenegaard Haubroe.

== Architecture ==
The current main building was built by Frederik Wilsbech for Otto Danneskjold-Samsøe in 1774–76. It is a one-story red brick building in Gothic Revival style with Crow-stepped gables. On each side of the building is a three-bay central projection tipped by a Crow-stepped gable. The central projection on the front side contains the main entrance, while the one on the rear side features a large veranda overlooking the garden. The central projection is flanked by two crow-stepped gable dormers on both sides of the building.

To the south of the main building, is a complex of buildings: Avlsgården (farm building) consists of four one-story buildings in red brick with details in yellow brick and red-painted timber, arched windows and tin roofs, Forvalterboligen (manager's house) is a one-story red brick building on a stone foundation. It has a red tile roof with three chimneys, Herskabsstalden (stables) is also a one-story brick building. It has a slate roof. A tall gabled dormer opens to the jayloft. A brick cornice runs below the roof. A total of 11 individual buildings have been listed. They include the main building, the four-winged complex of farm buildings, the farm manager's house with the stables and outbuilding and the gardener's house with another outbuilding.

== Today ==
The estate covers a total area of 1,151 hectares. It comprises the farm Klosterskovgård as well as the woodlands Elmelunde Kohave and Ridefogedlukke.

== List of owners ==
- (1774-1787) Jørgen Wichfeld
- (1787-1806) Peder Sølling
- (1806-1820) Christopher Schøller Bülow
- (1820-1823) Christian Conrad, Count of Danneskiold-Samsøe
- (1823-1894) Otto Sophus Danneskiold-Samsøe
- (1894-1908) Christian Conrad Sophus Danneskiold-Samsøe
- (1908-1916) Wanda Sophie Elisabeth Candia Zahrtmann, gift Danneskiold-Samsøe
- (1916-1930) Viggo Danneskiold-Samsøe
- (1930- ) J.S. Krarup
- (2002–2024) Jens Krarup Haubroe
- (1960-1990) Kirsten Haubroe (née Krarup)
- (1990-present) Kirstine Hvenegaard Haubroe
