= Christian Danneskiold-Samsøe (Danish nobleman, born 1836) =

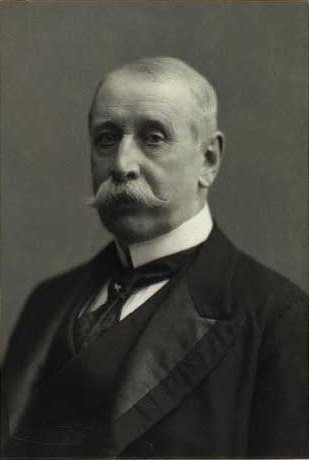
- Christian Conrad Sophus Danneskiold-Samsøe by Carl Sonne
- Born: 29 August 1836; Copenhagen, Denmark
- Died: 1 November 1908 (aged 72); Copenhagen, Denmark
- Education: University of Copenhagen
- Occupations: Arts administrator, landowner
- Spouse: Wanda Sophie Elisabeth Candia Zahrtmann
- Awards: Order of the Dannebrog

Christian Conrad Sophus, Count Danneskiold-Samsøe (29 August 1836 – 1 November 1908), normally referred to as Christian Danneskiold-Samsøe, was member of the Danish comital family Danneskiold-Samsøe, landowner and administrative leader of the Royal Danish Theatre.

== Early life and education ==
He was born in Copenhagen as the son of Postmaster-General Sophus Danneskiold-Samsøe and Frederikke Marie Danneskiold-Samsøe née Levetzow. He completed secondary school in 1855 and became cand. polit. from the University of Copenhagen in 1861.

== Career ==
He headed the court of crown prince Frederik (Frederik VIII) in 1869–1876. In August 1894, he succeeded Edvard Fallesen as head of the Royal Danish Theatre. He was instrumental in restoring the economy of the theatre.

== Property ==
His wife brought Annerup and Christiansholm into the marriage, transferring ownership of both properties to him in conjunction with the marriage. The two properties were sold in 1874 and 1900. In 1894, he succeeded his father as the owner of Nordfeld, Ålebækgård and Klosterskov on Møn.

== Personal life ==
He married Wanda Sophie Elisabeth Candia Zahrtmann (12 August 1842 – 27 April 1916) on 22 January 1863. She was a daughter of vice admiral and naval minister C. C. Zahrtmann and a cousin of the painter Kristian Zahrtmann. They had six children:

- Christian Valdemar Danneskiold-Samsøe (16 February 1864 – 14 March 1931)
- Frederikke Sophie Elisabeth Danneskiold-Samsøe (26 June 1865 – 8 July 1949)
- Elisabeth Danneskiold-Samsøe (28 October 1866 – 1950)
- Ove Danneskiold-Samsøe (22 December 1867 – 8 April 1947)
- Viggo Danneskiold-Samsøe (29 May 1874 – 24 January 1936)
- Knud Danneskiold-Samsøe (26 June 1876 – 22 July 1957)

== Honours ==
- Denmark:
  - Commander of the Dannebrog, 2nd Class, 28 July 1869; 1st Class, 31 October 1870; Grand Cross, 25 August 1906
  - Commemorative Medal for the Golden Wedding of King Christian IX and Queen Louise, 1892
  - Cross of Honour of the Order of the Dannebrog, 28 July 1894
- Kingdom of Portugal: Grand Cross of the Military Order of Christ
- Kingdom of Prussia:
  - Knight of the Prussian Crown, 1st Class
  - Knight of the Red Eagle, 2nd Class
- Russian Empire: Knight of St. Stanislaus, 2nd Class, ca. 1871; 1st Class
- Sweden-Norway:
  - Commander of the Polar Star, 27 July 1869; Commander Grand Cross, 11 October 1872
  - Commander of St. Olav, 1st Class, 31 October 1870
  - Knight of the Order of Charles XIII, 28 January 1899
- United Kingdom: Honorary Knight Commander of the Royal Victorian Order, 18 April 1904
