= Wichfeld =

Wichfeld is a Danish noble family which was founded by letters patent in 1777.

== History ==
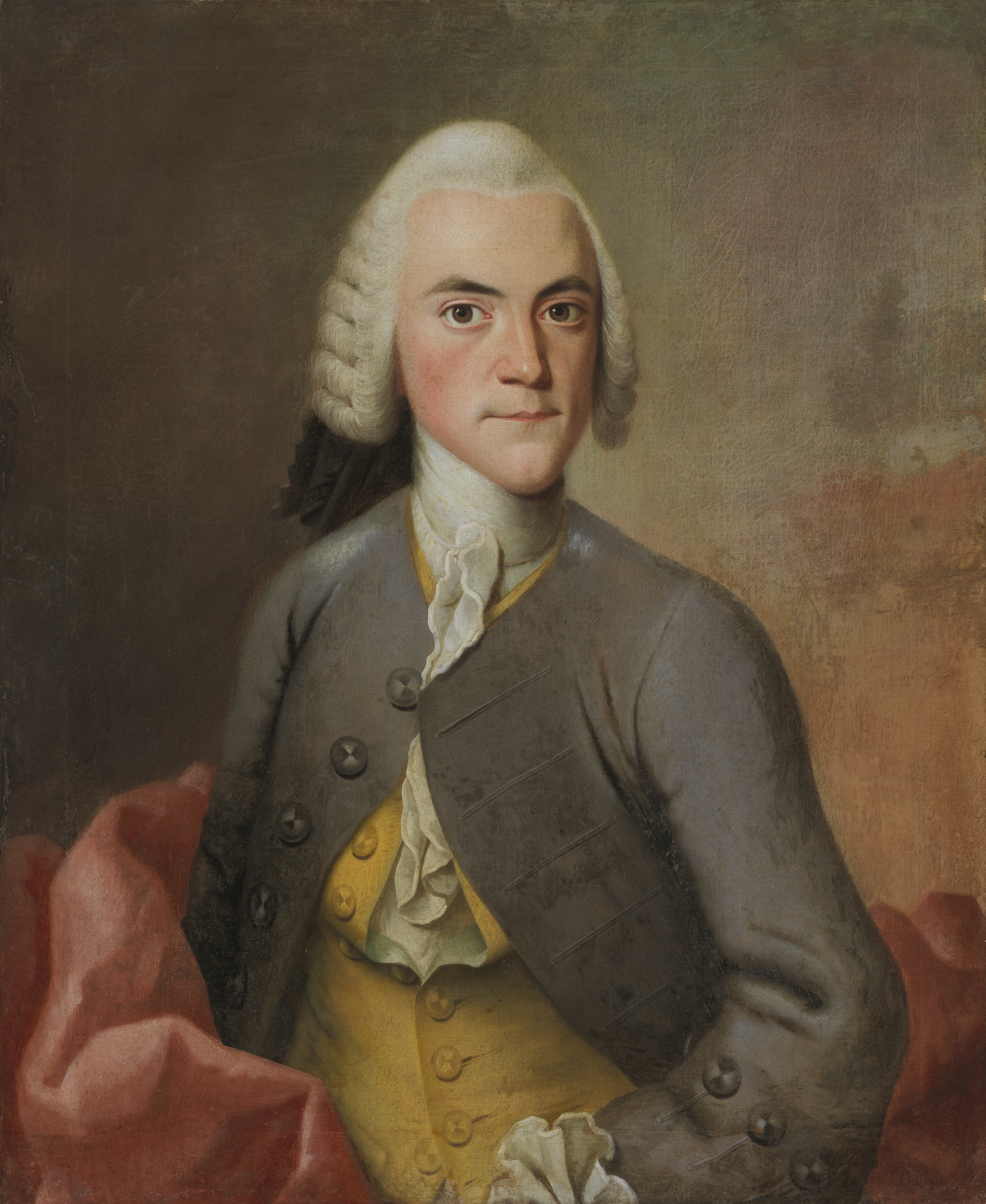
Jørgen Wichfeld

The noble family was founded when the brothers Jørgen Wichmand and Thomas Frederik Wichmand were ennobled by letters patent with the name Wichfeld on 23 July 1777. They were the sons of Bertel Wichmand (1677–1732), a wealthy merchant from Nykøbing Falster who had acquired the Engestofte on Lolland in 1727. Jørgen Wichmand had taken over the family estate in 1760. Jørgen Wichfeld never married and had no children, He, therefore, left Engestofte and Ulriksdal to his nephew Henning Wichfeld with an obligation to turn them into a stamhus (family foundation). This happened on 8 November 1799.

== Notable family members ==
- Jørgen Wichfeld (1729–1797), landowner, industrialist and district judge
- Thomas Frederik Wichfeld (1726–1803), military officer
- Jørgen Wichfeld (1800–1888), politician
- Monica Emily Wichfeld, née Massy-Beresford (1894–1945), member of the resistance movement during World War II
- Varinka Corina Wichfeld, gift Muus (9 February 1922 – 18 December 2002), member of the resistance movement during World War II
- Hubert Wichfeld (1886–1979), envoy
