= Flemming Muus =

Major Flemming Bruun Muus, DSO (born 21 November 1907, Copenhagen, Denmark – died 23 September 1982, Virum, Denmark) was a Danish writer and resistance fighter during the German occupation of Denmark in the Second World War.

In 1942, he was recruited in England by the Special Operations Executive and sent to Denmark in March 1943 as their chief agent. He was awarded the Distinguished Service Order for his contribution to the resistance movement and assistance with Denmark's liberation by the Allies.

After the war, Muus was arrested by British authorities for embezzlement and surrendered to the Danish. In June 1946 he was sentenced by a Copenhagen court to two years imprisonment for embezzlement. He was pardoned after a few months provided he went into voluntary exile from Denmark for five years. From 1946 to 1949, he and his wife travelled to England, South Africa and Italy before returning to Denmark. Muus himself admitted that large sums of money passed through his hands, but denied all embezzlement charges.

He was married to his wartime secretary Varinka Wichfeld Muus (9 February 1922 – 18 December 2002) who also contributed to the resistance movement and whose mother Monica Emily Wichfeld née Massy-Beresford was the first Danish woman to receive a capital sentence for resistance against the Germans.

His novel Der kom en dag became a war film in 1955.
