= Levetzow =

Levetzow is a surname. Notable people with the surname include:

- Albert von Levetzow (1827-1903), German politician, president of German Reichstag
- Amalie von Levetzow (1788-1868), German noblewoman
- Cornelia von Levetzow (1836-1921) Dutch-German noblewoman and writer
- Karl Michael von Levetzow (1871-1945), German librettist and poet
- Magnus von Levetzow (1871-1939), German naval officer
- Ulrike von Levetzow (1804-1899), German noblewoman
