= Rolf Muuss =

German-American psychologist (1924–2020)

Rolf Eduard Helmut Muuss (September 26, 1924 – July 3, 2020) was a German-American psychologist and academic. His work in psychology focused primarily on adolescent psychology and development. Muuss's academic career was spent primarily at Goucher College, where he taught from 1959 to 1995. Muuss enlisted and fought in the Luftwaffe during WWII.

== Early life ==
Muuss was born in Tating, a village in the North West of Germany on September 26, 1924. His parents were Rudolf A. Muuss and Else Osterwald, and he had two older siblings. In 1929, when Muuss was 4 years old, his mother died from breast cancer. His father remarried in 1931, and his new wife had three children, making Muuss one of 6.

== World War II ==
=== Hitler Youth ===
Muuss joined a junior branch of Hitler Youth at a young age, before officially joining Hitler Youth at the age of 14. Membership was compulsory for Muuss and many others. Over 90 percent of German children were members of Hitler Youth in 1939, a year after Muuss joined.

=== German Air Force ===
When Muuss was 17, he enlisted in the German Air Force, where he trained for two years in Ghent.

After completing his training Muuss was stationed at several German air bases, including those in northern France and Romania.

=== Prisoner of war ===
After the fall of Germany in 1945, Muuss was taken as an American prisoner of war. He was held in the Rhine meadow camps for 4 months.

Muuss very quickly "denazified" following the end of the war, as he was "too young to be a real Nazi".

== Education ==
=== Germany ===
During his childhood in Germany, Muuss completed education up to 10th grade. After working as a farmhand after the end of WWII, Muuss received an offer to work as a lay-teacher in Sylt, an island in the North Sea. After teaching for a year, Muuss returned to high school to further his own education and received his Abitur at the age of 23. Muuss then went on to receive his teaching diploma from the Teacher's College Flensburg-Murwik, from which he graduated with honors.

=== America ===
Once he had obtained his teaching diploma, Muuss received an offer to undertake a 9-month Teacher Training Program with the Office of Education in Washington, DC. Muuss spent part of 1951 and 1952 in Warrensburg, Missouri at Central Missouri State College.

Continuing his education in America, Muuss attended Columbia University where he studied adolescent and social psychology and mental health.

After returning to Germany for a brief period, Muuss decided to move to America permanently in 1953. He was able to further his education at Western Maryland College in the master's program, from which he graduated in 1954. Muuss then attended the University of Illinois, where he majored in Educational Psychology and minored in Clinical Psychology. He graduated with his doctorate in 1957.

== Career ==
=== Psychology ===
Muuss's work in psychology was focused on adolescent psychology and development. He thought that understanding human development was a valuable tool that could provide insight into raising and managing children and adolescents, and education and learning. Muuss believed development was influenced by external interacting conditions and factors, and could only be understood when all these contributors were considered.

Muuss's work in psychology has been recognised by the American Psychological Society, in which he was elected Fellow. He has also been acknowledged by the American Psychological Association.

==== Existentialism ====
Muuss drew his knowledge and understanding of existentialism from a wide variety of sources and perspectives. He examined it right from its roots, in the work of Socrates, Augustine, Descartes, and Pascal. He also drew from works by Soren Kierkegaard, Karl Jaspers, and Jean-Paul Sartre.

Muuss claimed that existentialism and philosophy provided a way to understand humans and their existence that could not be achieved via science. He believed existentialism was the counter movement to systematics and rationalism.

Muuss stated that existentialism is not concerned with external values, morals, or laws, and that these laws are in fact broken down and challenged in the process of understanding and accepting existentialism. He believed that rather than being influenced by these external values individuals create their own ideals. He drew this notion from the work of Sartre, particularly his book L ’Existentialisme est un hunznnisme. Muuss believed that existentialism was directly related to autonomy and freedom, and much more concerned with the individual than the society in which they exist. He stated that existentialism is a way to gain knowledge of ones self.

Muuss also believed existentialism to be inherently pessimistic, as it brought the "meaningfulness and the absurdity of existence" to light.

Muuss condensed these thoughts and beliefs about existentialism into the following ten characteristics:

1. Existentialism is the philosophy of freedom
2. Existentialism is a type of humanism
3. Existentialism is irrationalism
4. Existentialism is a radical subjectivism
5. Existentialism is pessimism
6. Existentialism is individualism
7. Existence is transcendence
8. Existentialism is self knowledge
9. The method of existentialism is dialectic
10. Existentialism is not only a philosophical but also a literary school

==== Studies ====
Muuss conducted a study investigating the relationship between causal orientation, anxiety and insecurity. The study identified and defined causality as knowledge and understanding of human behaviour and the influencing factors behind it. Muuss emphasised the aspect of seeing situations through other people's eyes, and recognising possible problems that could arise.

The target age group for the study was children in fifth and sixth grade. Muuss hypothesised that students with a high degree of causal orientation would display lower levels of anxiety and insecurity than those with lower causal orientation. For the study, Muuss tested 179 fifth-grade students and 280 sixth-grade students. He administered a variety of tests, including the Social Causal Test, Physical Causal Test, Kooker Security-Insecurity Scale, Children's Manifest Anxiety Scale, and the 11-item L scale. These tests allowed Muuss to identify the level of causal orientation in each student, as well as their levels of anxiety and insecurity.

The results of the study proved Muuss's hypothesis to be correct. The students with higher causal orientation showed lower levels of insecurity and anxiety, while those who were highly causally oriented displayed more insecurity and anxiety.

Following from this, Muuss conducted another study based on causality, this time investigating the results of a causal-learning program. The study was based on an experimental learning program designed by the University of Iowa's Preventative Psychiatry Program. The program's aim was to foster and aid in the development of a causal orientation and understanding. Muuss's study focused primarily on the effects this learning program had on the mental health of those who participated.

Muuss's hypothesis for the study was that subjects who had undertaken the learning program would develop and demonstrate a stronger, more informed understanding of causality. He also believed that these subjects would have more positive mental health indices than the control group who did not participate in the program.

The test subjects of this study were the aforementioned 280 sixth-grade students from Muuss's former causality study. Approximately half of these students had participated in the experimental learning program with the Preventative Psychiatry Program, and the other half acted as the controls in the study. Those students who had participated were split into two groups, one of which undertook the program for two years, the other for one year. The study included several different tests which aimed to measure causal understanding and indices of mental health.

The results of the study showed that students who participated in the experimental learning program demonstrated higher causal understanding and more positive mental health indices than those who did not. These findings supported Muuss's hypothesis for the study.

==== Examination of theories ====
One aspect of Muuss's work in psychology is his examination of developmental theories, with a particular focus on adolescence. Among others, Muuss reviewed the theories and work of Sigmund Freud, Erik Erikson, Jean Piaget, and Carol Gilligan. Muuss believed that theories of development could be categorised into "families", based on the different original ideas from which the theories developed. For example, Muuss stated that Erikson's work had a basis in the work of Freud, and that therefore their theories belong to the same family. Muss also believed that the theories of Piaget, Kohlberg, and Gilligan were related.

Muuss credits Sigmund Freud with founding the psychoanalytic movement, and changing the foundation of psychiatry and psychology. He recognises Freud's influence in areas including literature, advertising, art, philosophy, sociology, medication, and education. For example, as Muuss has stated, Freud's assumption that "frustration of normal satisfaction may lead to the development of neurosis" implies that educators should not frustrate their students. Muuss believed that this was proof that educators should create environments that include leniency, approval, and attention.

In regards to the work of Erikson, in particular his theory of identity development, Muuss recognised not only the similarities to Freud, but also the increased acknowledgement of societal influence on development. Muuss believed Erikson's theory to be the base of contemporary identity research.

Muuss reviewed Piaget's cognitive theory of adolescence. While Muss recognised that Piaget's theory has been criticised and suffered a loss of popularity, he believed that Piaget was responsible for completely changing the approach to and knowledge of children's learning in the Western world. Muuss stated "Piaget's influence will remain an intellectual, philosophical, and theoretical force to reckon with during much of the twenty-first century".

Muuss took interest in and reviewed Gilligan's theory of sex differences, particularly in regard to the development of moral reasoning during adolescence. He was interested in the contradiction Gilligan's theory posed to work by Lawrence Kohlberg that claimed to demonstrate a higher level of moral judgement and maturity in males than females. Gilligan stated that Kohlberg's research was impacted by a gender bias held by Kohlberg. Muuss, while intrigued by this theory, acknowledged that the factual foundation on which it was formed was weak, and had inadequate backing from other studies and research.

As well as theories, Muuss also reviewed the Laurel School Study (1986–1990), which was conducted by Gilligan along with Lyn Mikel Brown. Muuss discussed the difficulty adolescent girls have with relationships and free self-expression. He proposed that authentic relationships are hard for adolescent girls to achieve and maintain, as they are afraid that being open about their thoughts and feelings will pose a threat to the relationships they have with others. Muuss stated that this forms the "unauthentic voice of adolescence". Muuss's reflection on the study also discusses the risk of adolescent girls losing their identities as a result of trying to fit in and please others.

=== Academics ===
In 1957, Muuss began his academic career at the University of Iowa as a Research Assistant Professor, working in the Iowa Child Welfare Research Station.

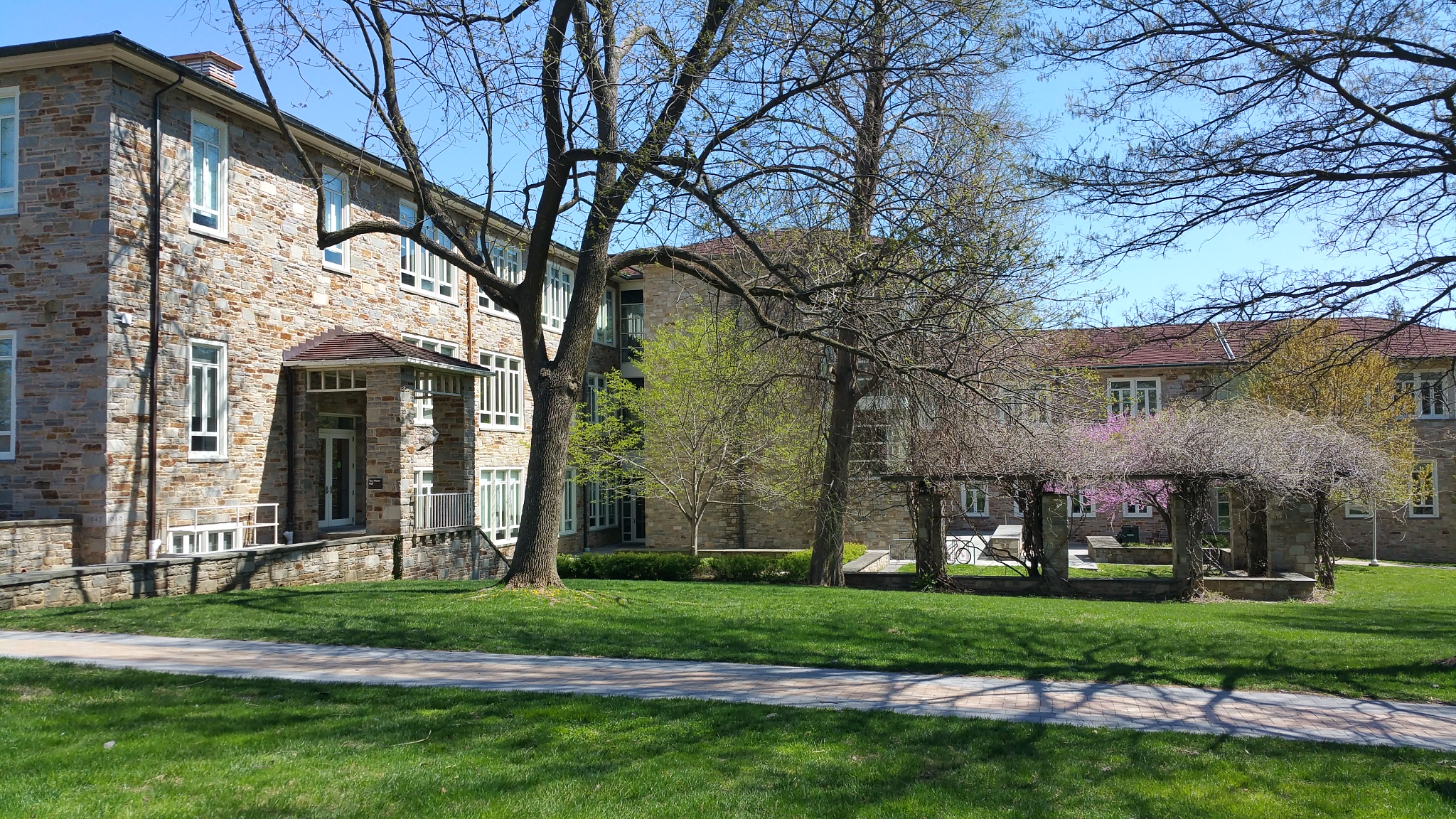
Goucher College Van Meter Hall

Muuss then commenced teaching at Goucher College, Maryland in 1959. Here he focused on Child and Adolescent Development, Educational Psychology, Learning Theory, Test and Measurement, Diagnosis of Children, Counselling, and Case Study. Muuss worked at Goucher College for 36 years. During this time he assumed the positions of Chairman of the Education Program, Chairman of Sociology and Anthropology, Director of the Special Education Program, and professor emeritus of Education. Muuss retired from Goucher College in 1995, upon which the college created the Rolf Muuss Prize in Special Education.

As well as Goucher College, Muuss also taught at The Johns Hopkins University, Pädagogische Hochschule Kiel, University of British Columbia, University of Delaware, University of Illinois, Sheppard and Enoch Pratt Hospital Training Program for Psychiatrists, and Towson State University.

== Personal life ==
=== Family ===
Muuss had two weddings with Gertrude Kremser. The pair were legally wed on 22 December 1953 in California, but had a church wedding in Flensburg in 1954. The second ceremony was officiated by Muuss's father. Following their wedding in 1954, Muuss and his wife honeymooned in Europe, after which Muuss continued his education in America. Muuss and Gertrude remained married up until Gertrude died in 1999 after being diagnosed with cancer.

Together with Gertrude, Muuss had two children. His son Michael was born in 1958, and his daughter Gretchen was born in 1961. Michael was killed in a car accident in late 2000, a year after his mother's death. Prior to his death, Michael was an accomplished computer scientist. Gretchen attended Goucher College as a senior from 1982 to 1983, where her father Muuss taught. She went on to become a computer accounting specialist.

=== Death ===
Muuss died of heart failure on 3 July 2020 at the age of 95. He died in Towson, Maryland at the University of Maryland St. Joseph Medical Centre.

== Selected works ==
- Muuss, Rolf Eduard Helmut (1962). First-Aid for Classroom Discipline Problems. Holt, Rinehart and Winston. OCLC 24008502.
- Muuss, Rolf Eduard Helmut (1980). Adolescent Behavior and Society: A Book of Readings. Random House. ISBN 978-0-394-32364-0.
- Muuss, Rolf Eduard Helmut (1988). Theories of Adolescence. Random House : McGraw-Hill. ISBN 978-0-394-37517-5.
