= Fremmedarbejderbladet =

Fremmedarbejderbladet (transl. The Foreign Worker Journal, or Foreign Workers' Paper, Turkish: Yabanci Ișc̦iler Gazetesi, Serbo-Croatian: List Stranih Radnika, Arabic: صحيفة العامل المغترب) was a journal for foreign workers in Denmark that was published monthly from 1971 through 1977. The paper was published in Danish, Turkish and Serbo-Croatian for its entire duration, in Arabic from 1971-1972, in Urdu from 1971-1972 and 1973-1977, and in English from 1972-1973. Ole Hammer served as editor-in-chief.

The paper catered especially to foreign workers who arrived in Denmark from the 1960s through 1973 from Turkey, Yugoslavia, Pakistan, the Middle East and North Africa (comparable to the Gastarbeiter in Germany), and provided information about housing, work permits, collective bargaining, taxes, health and safety at work, and Danish culture more generally (including the women's liberation movement and sexual revolution in Denmark).

Fremmedarbejderbladet received funding from a variety of sources, including the Danish Employers Association (DA), the Danish Confederation of Trade Unions (LO), the Danish Federation of Unskilled Laborers and Specialist Workers (DASF, or SiD), the Ministry of Labor, the Danish Association for International Co-operation (Mellemfolkeligt Samvirke or MS), the Danish Smith and Machine Workers Association (today Danish Union of Metalworkers), and from advertisements and subscriptions.
