= Engestofte =

Neoclassical manor house in Lolland, Denmark

Coordinates: 54°45′42″N 11°33′54″E

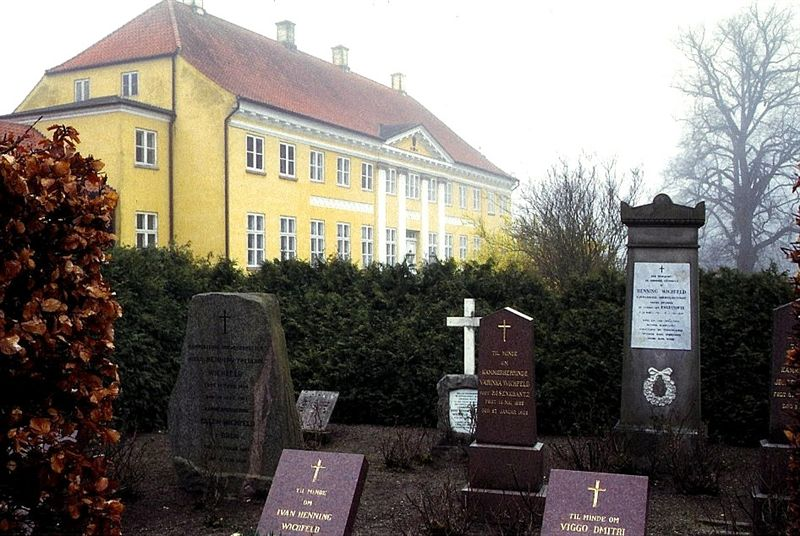
Engestofte

Engestofte is a Neoclassical manor house located 6 km (4 mi) east of Maribo, Lolland Municipality, on the island of Lolland in southeastern Denmark.

== History and architecture ==
=== Early history ===
The estate was first mentioned in the 13th century. For a period it belonged to the Crown until it came into the hands of changing noble families.

=== Wichfeld family ===
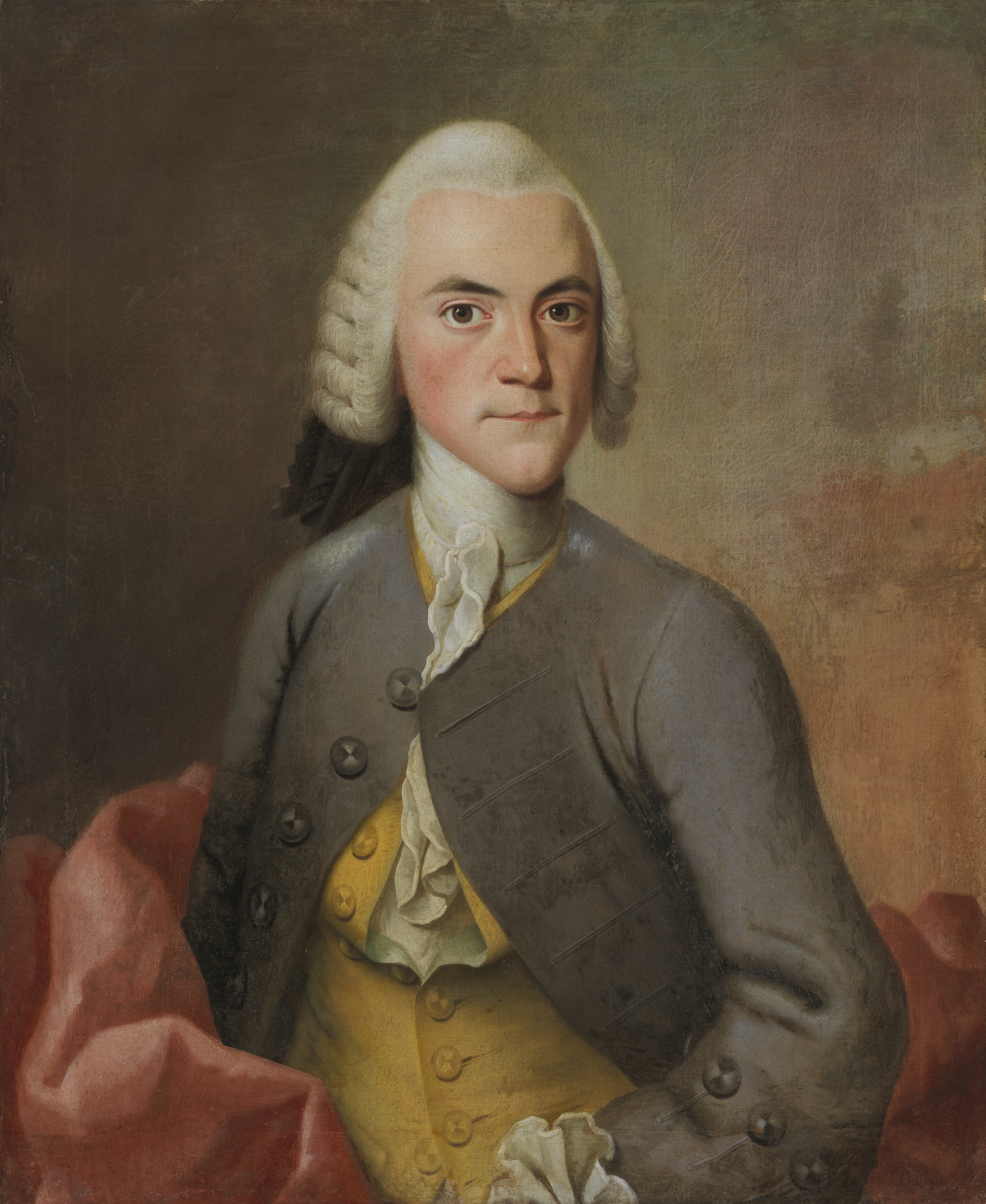
Jørgen Wichfeld

Bertel Wichmand (1677–1732), a wealthy merchant from Nykøbing Falster, acquired Engestofte in 1727. His widow kept the estate after her husband's death. Upon her death in 1751, it passed to their eldest son, Jørgen Wichmand. He and his brother Thomas Frederik Wichmand were ennobled by letters patent with the name Wichfeld on 23 July 1777.

Jørgen Wichfeld never married and had no children, He therefore left Engestofte and Ulriksdal to his nephew Henning Wichfeld with an obligation to turn them into a stamhus (family foundation). This happened on 8 November 1799.

The two-storey Neoclassical building was built in 1807 and expanded in 1889. The facade of the simply-designed residence is adorned with four iconic pilasters and a triangular pediment.

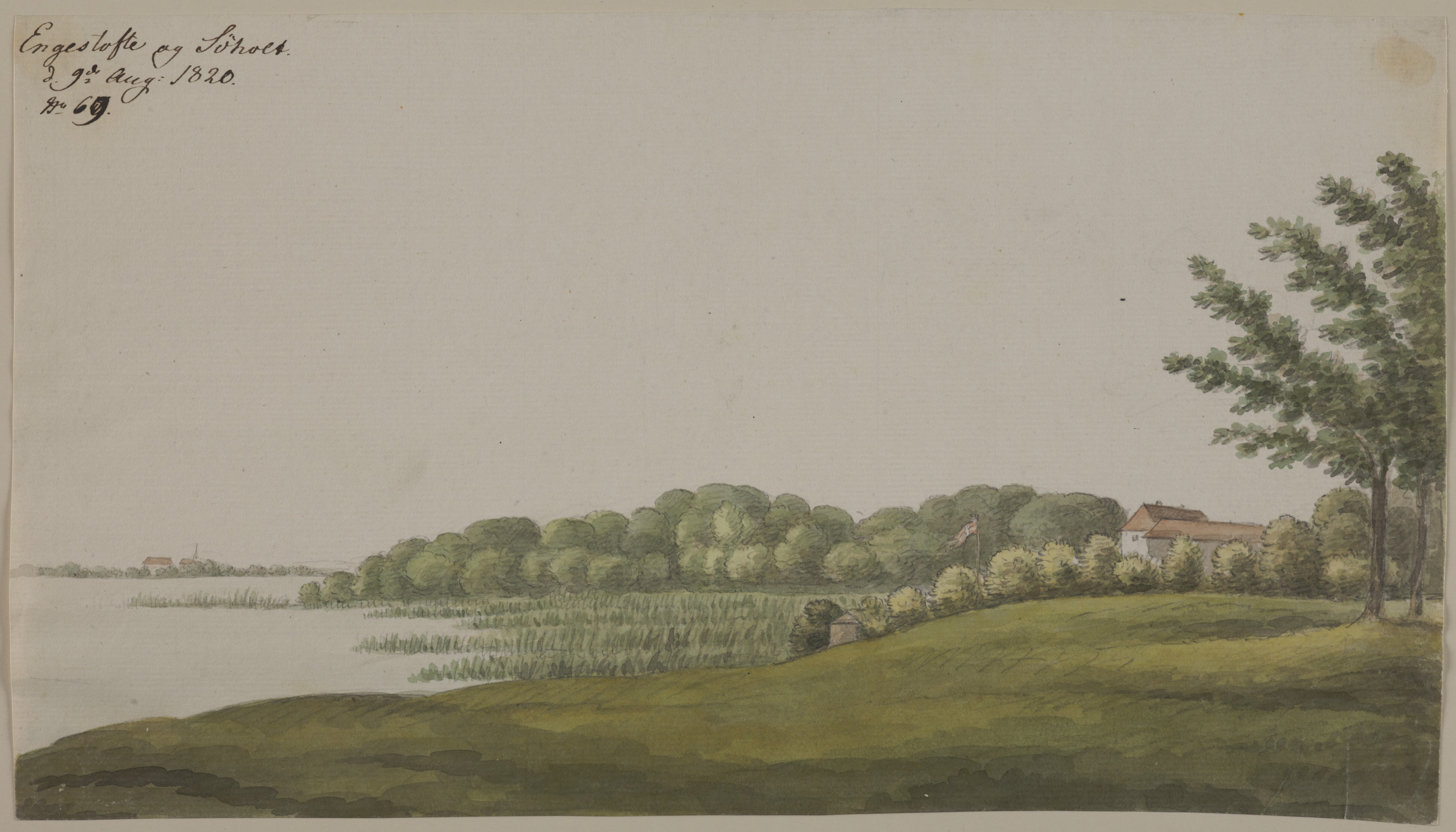
Ole Jørgen Rawert: Engestofte and Söholt, 9. August 1820.

Monica Emily Wichfeld (née Massey-Beresford), who was from Ulster in the north of Ireland and who married Jørgen Adalbert Wichfeld in 1916, was impressed with the forty-roomed mansion, the surrounding buildings, the long driveway lined with limes and elms, and the terraces leading from the house down to the lake below.

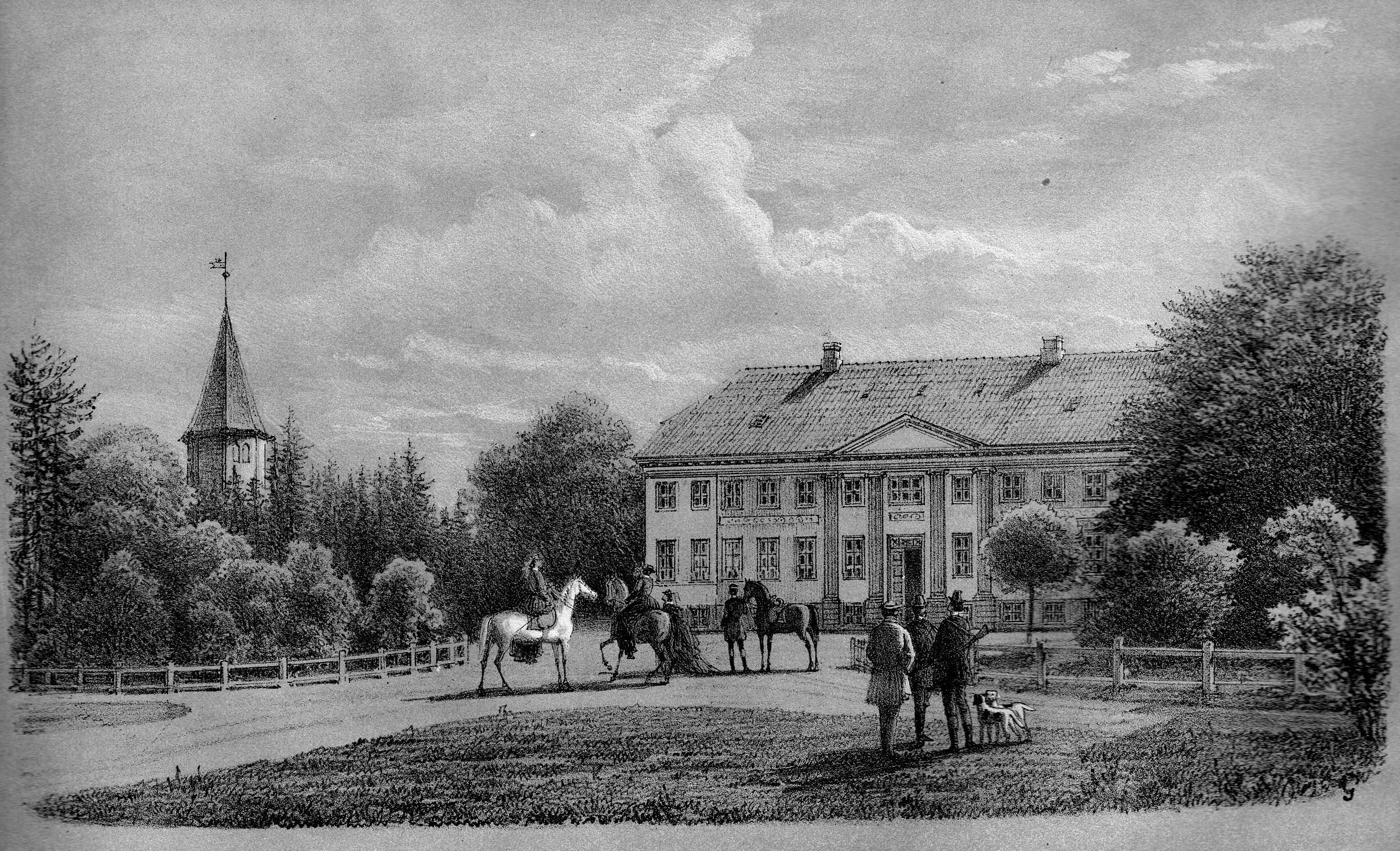
Engestofte depicted by Ferdinand Richardt in 1867

The estate cottage and grounds was used in co-operation with Monica Wichfeld during the Danish Resistance in the Second World War to harbour fugitives, to shelter Jewish families hiding from the Gestapo, to train saboteurs and hide weapons, ammunition and explosives and organize the movement. It was also used as a covert landing ground for the British Special Operations Executive (SOE) deliveries of paratroopers, information, weapons and explosives.

=== Later history ===
Jørgen Adalbert Wichfeld died in 1965 and the estate was inherited by his son Viggo Dimitri who renovated it completely. Sadly, Viggo ran into financial difficulties and was forced to sell the estate to William Erik Berntsen, owner of Frederikssund Iron Foundry and Machine Factory. His son William OleBerntsen inherited the estate in 1995 and one year later purchased the neighboring estate Søholt. He left both estates to a foundation but the relevant authorities turned down the foundation's application for a dispensation from the Agriculture Act and demanded a sale of the estates. rederik von Lüttichau bought both estates in 2003 but sold Engestofte to Hans Peter Egeskov in 2011.

== Access ==
The property is not open to the public but can be seen from the churchyard.

== List of owners ==
- (1457-1496) Kronen
- (1496-1527) Jørgen Olsen Baad
- (1527-1529) Elsebe Albrechtsdatter Grubendal, gift Baad
- (1529-1537)Johan Jørgensen Urne
- (1537-1558) Jørgen Urne
- (1558-1584) Peder Ottesen Huitfeldt
- (1584-1598) Barbara Huitfeldt, gift Grabow
- (1598- ) Hans Grabow
- (1584-1599) Hans Wittrup
- (1599- ) Anne Huitfeldt, gift Wittrup
- (1599-1639) Christian Friis
- (1639-1653) Barbara Wittrup, gift Friis
- (1653- ) Anne Friis, gift Juul
- ( -1684) Tønne Juul
- (1684-1695) Anne Friis, gift Juul
- (1695-1720) Christian Lerche
- (1720- ) Sophie Ulrikke von Reichau, gift 1) Lerche, 2) Hausmann
- ( -1727) Christian Ulrich von Hausmann
- (1727-1732) Bertel Wichmand
- (1732-1751) Bodil Cathrine From, gift 1) Wichmand, 2) Rasmussen
- (1751-1797)Jørgen Wichmand Wichfeld
- (1797-1799) Boet efter Jørgen Jørgen Wichfeld
- (1799-1846) Henning Wichfeld
- (1846-1888)Jørgen Wichfeld
- (1888-1907) Henning Wichfeld
- (1907-1965) Jørgen Adalbert Wichfeld
- (1965-1967) Viggo Dimitri Wichfeld
- (1967-1994) William Erik Berntsen
- (1994-1995) William Odd Berntsen
- (1995-2003) William O. Berntsens Fond
- (2003-2011) Frederik von Lüttichau
- (2011-present) Hans Peter Egeskov

== Literature ==
- Marryat, Horace (1860). A Residence in Jutland, the Danish Isles, and Copenhagen. J. Murray. pp. 307–.
