= Lolland-Falster =

Danish islands of Lolland and Falster

Coordinates: 54.8611°N 11.8972°E

Lolland-Falster is a common term for the two islands Lolland and Falster. The islands are only separated by the narrow strait Guldborgsund, and as such have traditionally been grouped together.

Both the Gedser-Rostock and Rødby-Puttgarden ferry lines are on Lolland-Falster. The Fehmarn Belt Fixed Link, due to open in 2021, will connect Rødby in Lolland with Puttgarden in Germany, thereby providing a direct link between Germany and Sweden through Lolland-Falster.
