= Fiil =

Fiil may refer to:

- Gerda Fiil (1927–1994), Danish resistance member
- Gudrun Fiilil (1890–1972), Danish resistance member
- Kirstine Fiil (1918–1983), Danish resistance member
- Marius Fiil (1893–1944), Danish resistance member
- Niels Fiil (1920–1944), Danish resistance member
