= Johan Kjær Hansen =

Danish resistance member (1907–1944)

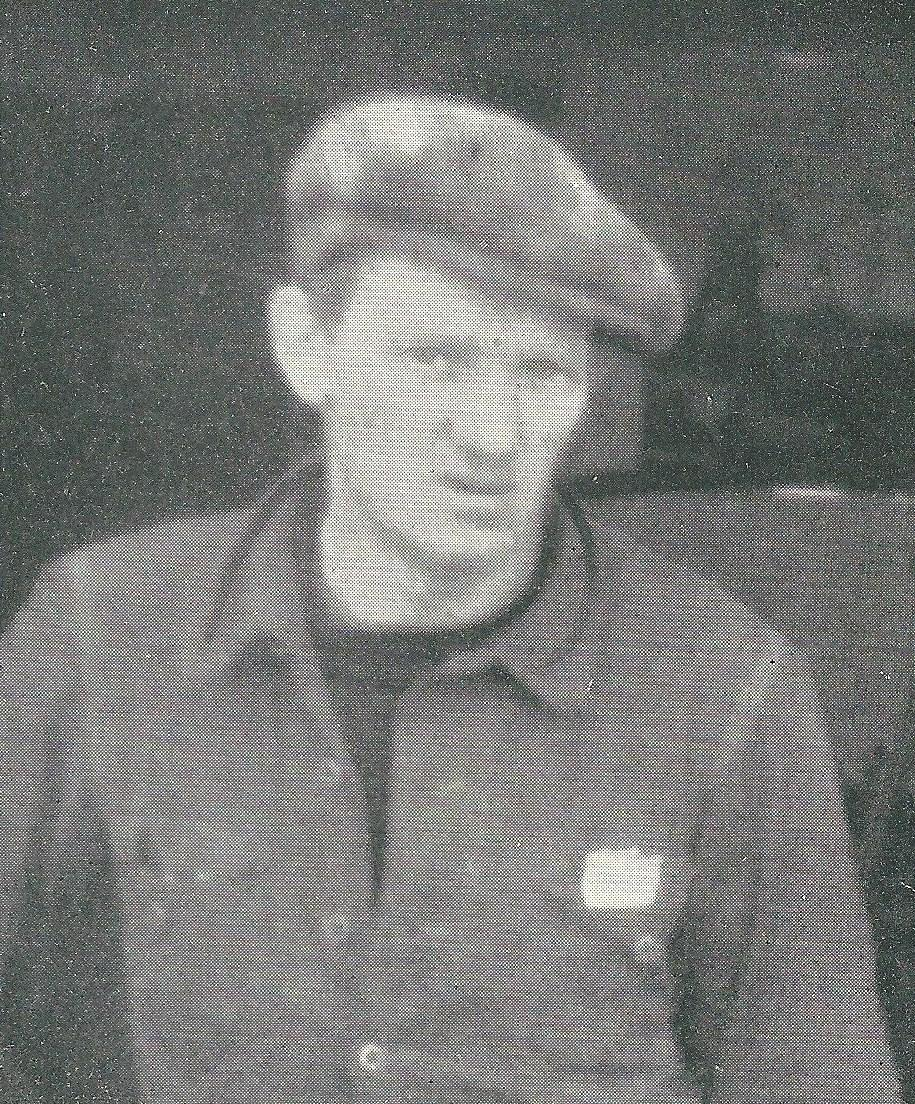
- Johan Kjær Hansen
- Born: Johan Kjær Hansen; 7 April 1907; Hjørring
- Died: 29 June 1944 (aged 37); Ryvangen
- Cause of death: Execution by firing squad
- Occupation: Mechanic
- Known for: Executed as member of the Danish resistance movement
- Spouse: (married until 1944)
- Parent(s): Hans Christian Johan Andreas Hansen and Anna Elisabeth Nielsen née Kjær
- Website: "Modstandsdatabasen" [Resistance Database]. Johan Kjær Hansen (in Danish). Copenhagen: Nationalmuseet.

Johan Kjær Hansen (7 April 1907 – 29 June 1944) was a member of the Danish resistance executed by the German occupying power.

== Biography ==
In addition to being a member of the Hvidsten group Hansen was also a mechanic.

The group helped the British Special Operations Executive parachute weapons and supplies into Denmark for distribution to the resistance.

In March 1944 the Gestapo made an "incredible number of arrests" including in the region of Randers where a number of members of the Hvidsten group were arrested.

The following month De frie Danske reported that several arrestees from Hvidsten had been transferred from Randers to Vestre Fængsel.

On 29 June 1944 Hansen and seven other members of the Hvidsten group were executed in Ryvangen.

== After his death ==
On 15 July 1944 De frie Danske reported on the execution of several members of the Hvidsten group. Six months later the January 1945 issue of the resistance newspaper Frit Danmark (Free Denmark) reported that on 29 June the previous year Hansen and seven other named members of the Hvidsten group had been executed.

On 5 July 1945 Hansen's remains and those of five others from the group were found in Ryvangen and transferred to the Department of Forensic Medicine of the university of Copenhagen where an inquest the same day showed that he was executed with gunshot wounds to the chest.< The remains of the two remaining executed members of the group, Marius Fiil and his son Niels had been found in the same area three days before.

On 10 July he was together with the seven other executed group members cremated at Bispebjerg Cemetery.

In 1945 a memorial stone over the eight executed members of the Hvidsten group was raised near Hvidsten Inn.

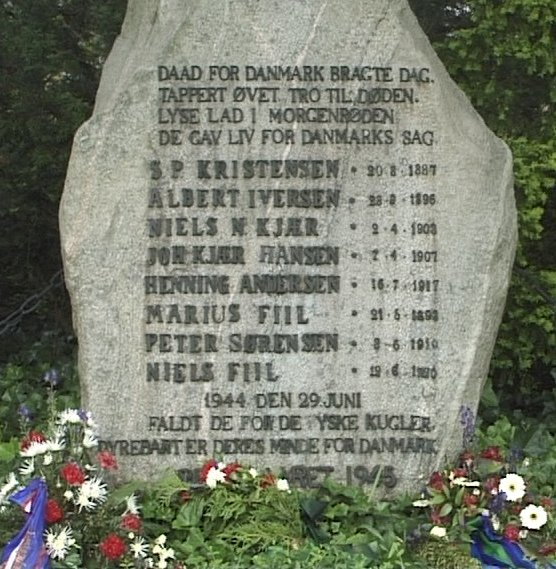
Memorial stone for the Hvidsten group in Hvidsten

Similarly a larger memorial stone for resistance members including the eight executed members of the Hvidsten group has been laid down in Ryvangen Memorial Park.

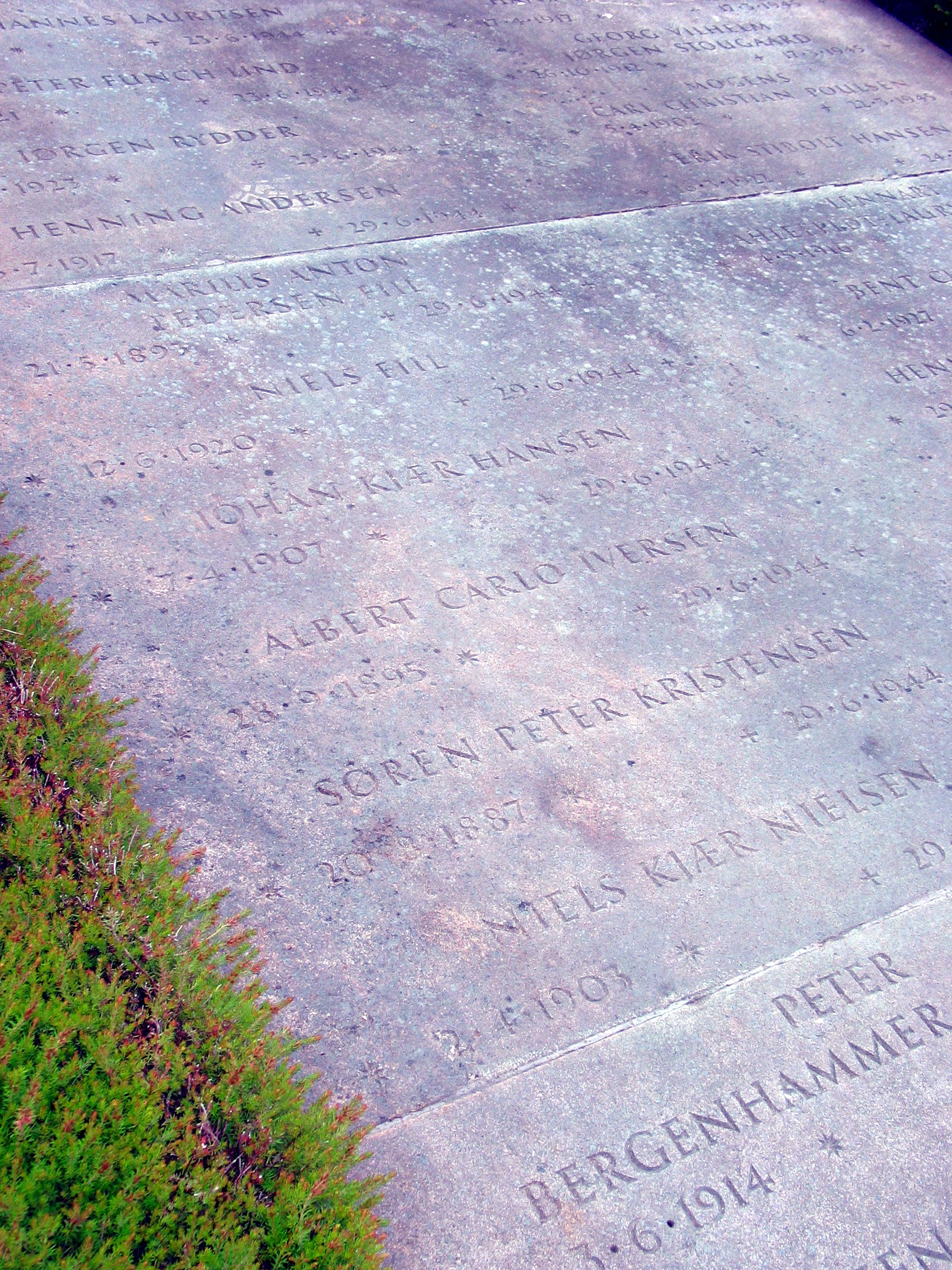
Memorial stone in Ryvangen for resistance members including the Hvidsten group

== Portrayal in the media ==
- In the 2012 Danish drama film Hvidsten Gruppen (This Life) Johan Kjær Hansen is portrayed by Henrik Vestergaard.
