= Kjær =

Kjær is a surname of Danish origin, meaning carr or fen. The name is used in Denmark and Norway. It may refer to any of the following people:

- Alberte Kjær Pedersen (born 1998), Danish long-distance runner
- Andreas Kjær (1881–1983), Norwegian civil servant and politician
- Andreas Kjær (born 1963), Danish physician-scientist
- Birthe Kjær (born 1948), Danish singer
- Bodil Kjær (born 1932), Danish architect and furniture designer
- Dorte Kjær (born 1964), Danish badminton player
- Ejnar Martin Kjær (1893–1947), Danish politician
- Heidi Kjær, Danish cricketer
- Henriette Kjær (born 1966), Danish politician
- Henriette Kjær Nielsen (born 1970), Danish tennis player
- Hjalmar Kjær (1872–1933), Danish architect
- Jacob Kjær (1896–1957), Furniture designer and cabinetmaker
- Jacob Kjær, former member of the band Royal Hunt
- Jeppe Borild Kjær (1896–1957), Danish furniture designer
- Jeppe Kjær Jensen (born 2004), Danish footballer
- Johan Kjær Hansen (1907–1944), Danish resistance member
- Julie Kjær Molnar (born 1993), Norwegian curler
- Kirsten Kjær (1893–1985), Danish painter
- Kjell Kjær (1942–2025), Norwegian actor, puppeteer, director, and program host
- Knut N. Kjær (born 1956), Norwegian economist
- Lasse Kjær Møller (born 1996), Danish handball player
- Lisa Kjær Gjessing (born 1978), Danish parataekwondo practitioner
- Nicolai Budkov Kjær (born 2006), Norwegian tennis player
- Niels Nielsen Kjær (1903–1944), Danish resistance member
- Nils Kjær (1870–1924), Norwegian playwright
- Ole Kjær (born 1954), Danish footballer
- Oluf Wesmann-Kjær (1874–1945), Norwegian sport shooter
- Peder Kjær (born 1935), Danish footballer
- Peter Kjær (born 1965), Danish footballer, television commentator and sporting director
- Peter Kjær (1949–2021), Danish architect
- Poul Kjær Poulsen (born 1952), Danish handball player
- Rasmus Kjær (born 1998), Danish badminton player
- Simon Kjær (born 1989), Danish footballer
- Stine Kjær Dimun (born 1979), Danish footballer
- Thomas Kjær Olsen (born 1997), Danish motorcycle racer
- Victoria Kjær Theilvig (born 2003), Danish model
