= Hvidsten =

Hvidsten may refer to:

== People ==
- Ragnar Hvidsten (1926-2016), Norwegian football player

== Places ==
- Hvidsten, Denmark

== Other ==
- Hvidsten Group, Danish WWII resistance group
- Hvidsten Inn, historic Danish inn
