= Henning Andersen =

Danish resistance member (1917–1944)

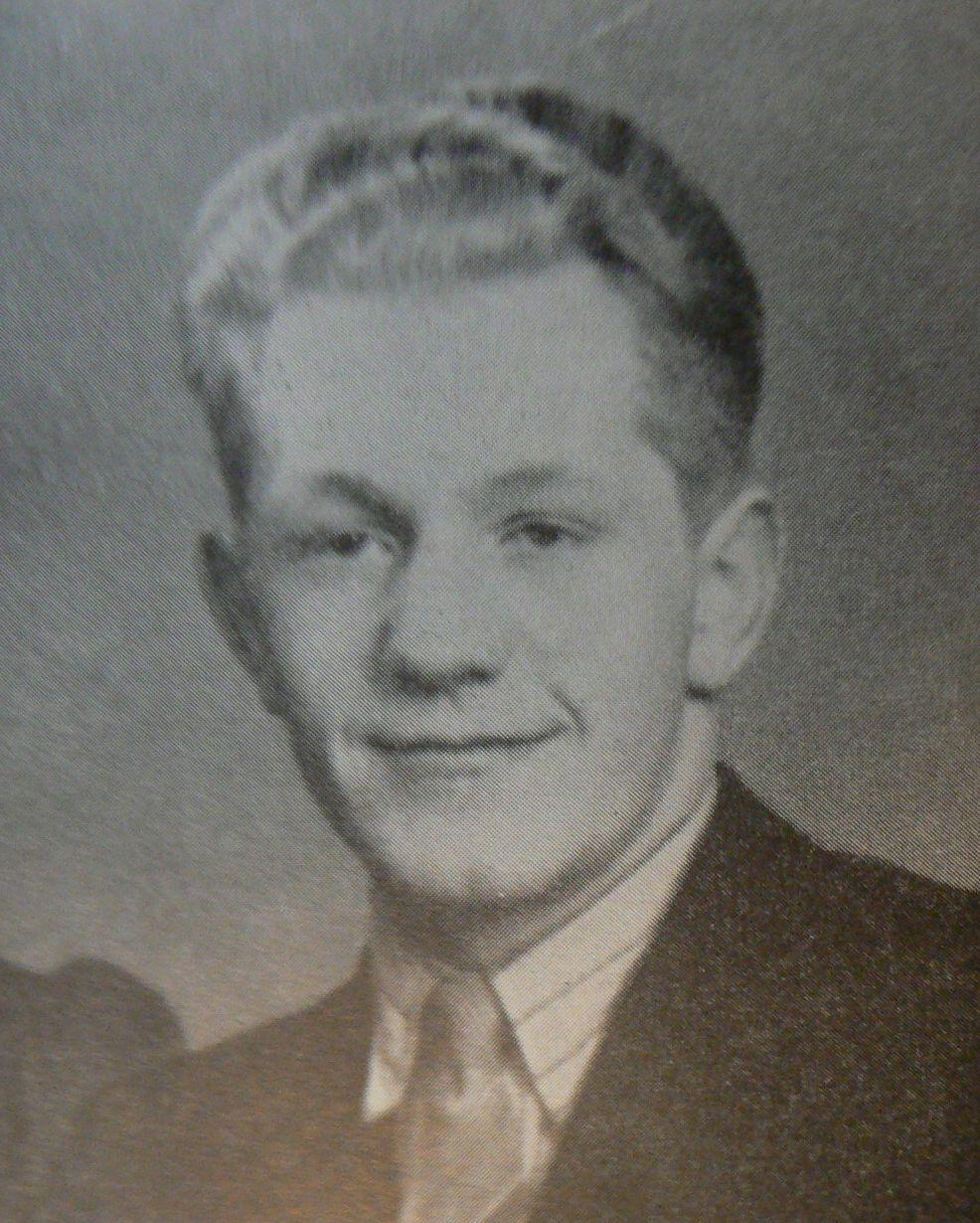
- Born: 16 July 1917; Linde, Denmark
- Died: 29 June 1944 (aged 26); Ryvangen, Denmark
- Cause of death: Execution by firing squad, gunshot wounds to the chest
- Occupation: Miller
- Known for: Executed as member of the Danish resistance movement
- Website: "Modstandsdatabasen" [Resistance Database]. Henning Andersen (in Danish). Copenhagen: Nationalmuseet.

Henning Andersen (16 July 1917 – 29 June 1944) was a member of the Danish resistance executed by the German occupying power.

== Biography ==
In addition to being a member of the Hvidsten group, Andersen was also a miller.

The group helped the British Special Operations Executive parachute weapons and supplies into Denmark for distribution to the resistance.

In March 1944, the Gestapo made an "incredible number of arrests" including in the region of Randers where a number of members of the Hvidsten group were arrested.

The following month, De frie Danske (The Free Danes) reported that several arrestees from Hvidsten had been transferred from Randers to Vestre Fængsel.

On 29 June 1944, Andersen and seven other members of the Hvidsten group were executed in Ryvangen.

== After his death ==
On 15 July 1944, De frie Danske reported on the execution of several members of the Hvidsten group. Six months later the January 1945 issue of the resistance newspaper Frit Danmark (Free Denmark) reported that on 29 June the previous year Andersen and seven other named members of the Hvidsten group had been executed.

On 10 July he was, together with the seven other executed group members, cremated at Bispebjerg Cemetery.

In 1945 a memorial stone over the eight executed members of the Hvidsten group was raised near Hvidsten kro.

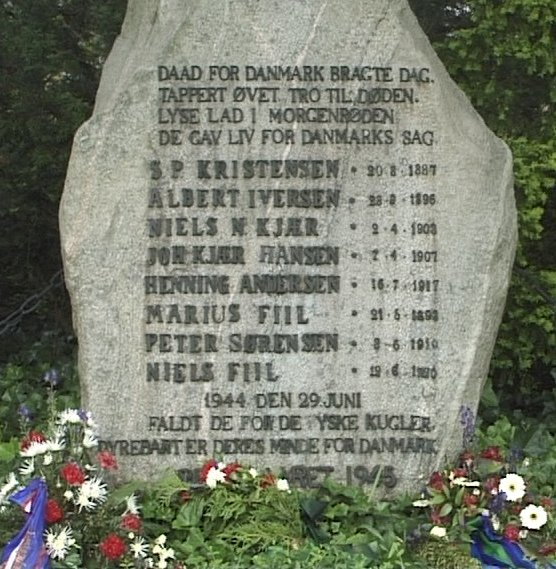
Memorial stone for the Hvidsten group in Hvidsten

Similarly, a larger memorial stone for resistance members, including the eight executed members of the Hvidsten group, has been laid down in Ryvangen Memorial Park.

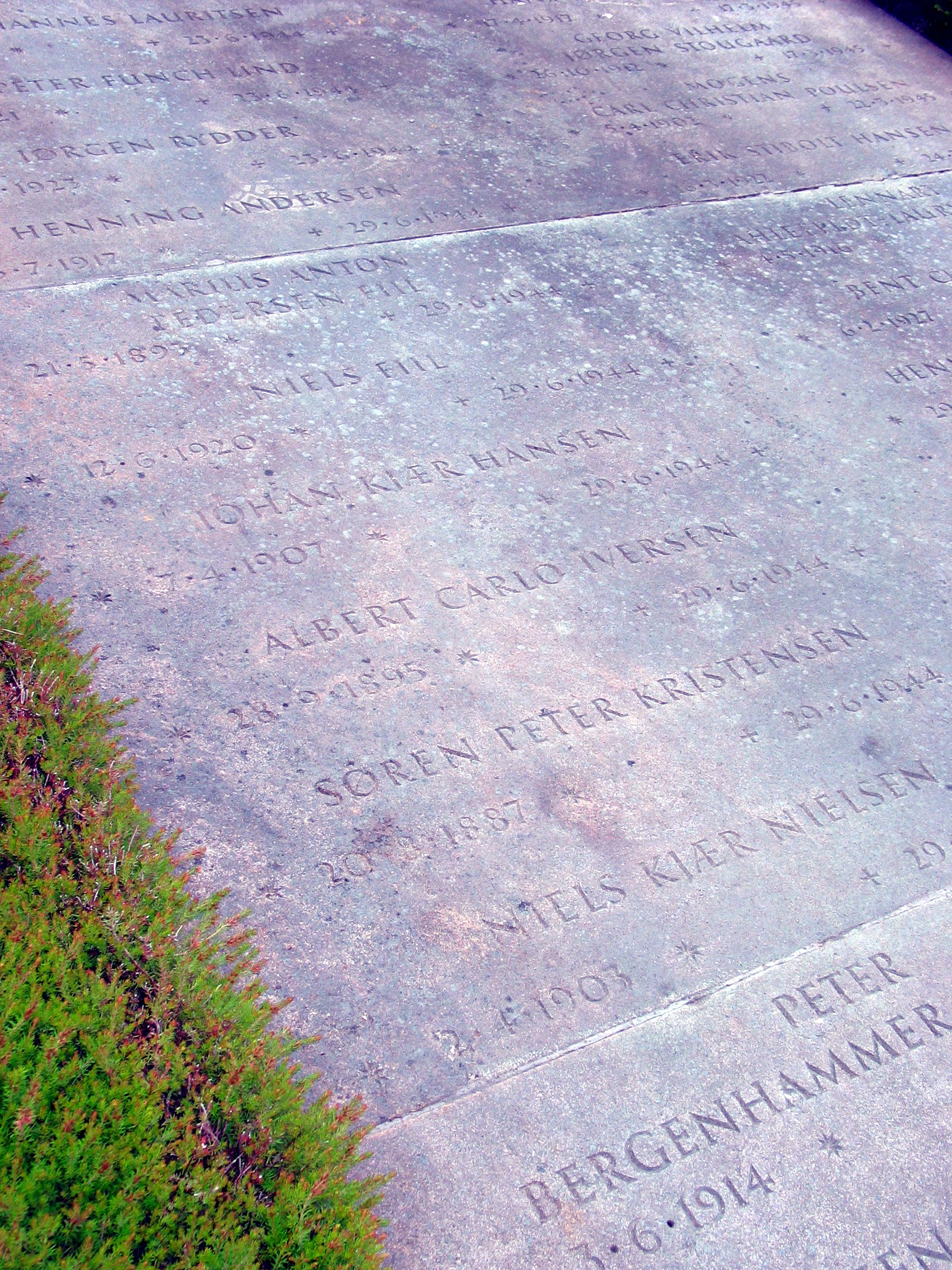
Memorial stone in Ryvangen for resistance members including the Hvidsten group

== Portrayal in the media ==
In the 2012 Danish drama film Hvidsten Gruppen (This Life), Henning Andersen is portrayed by Janus Kim Elsig (as Janus Elsig).
