= Peder Bergenhammer Sørensen =

Member of the Danish anti-Nazi resistance

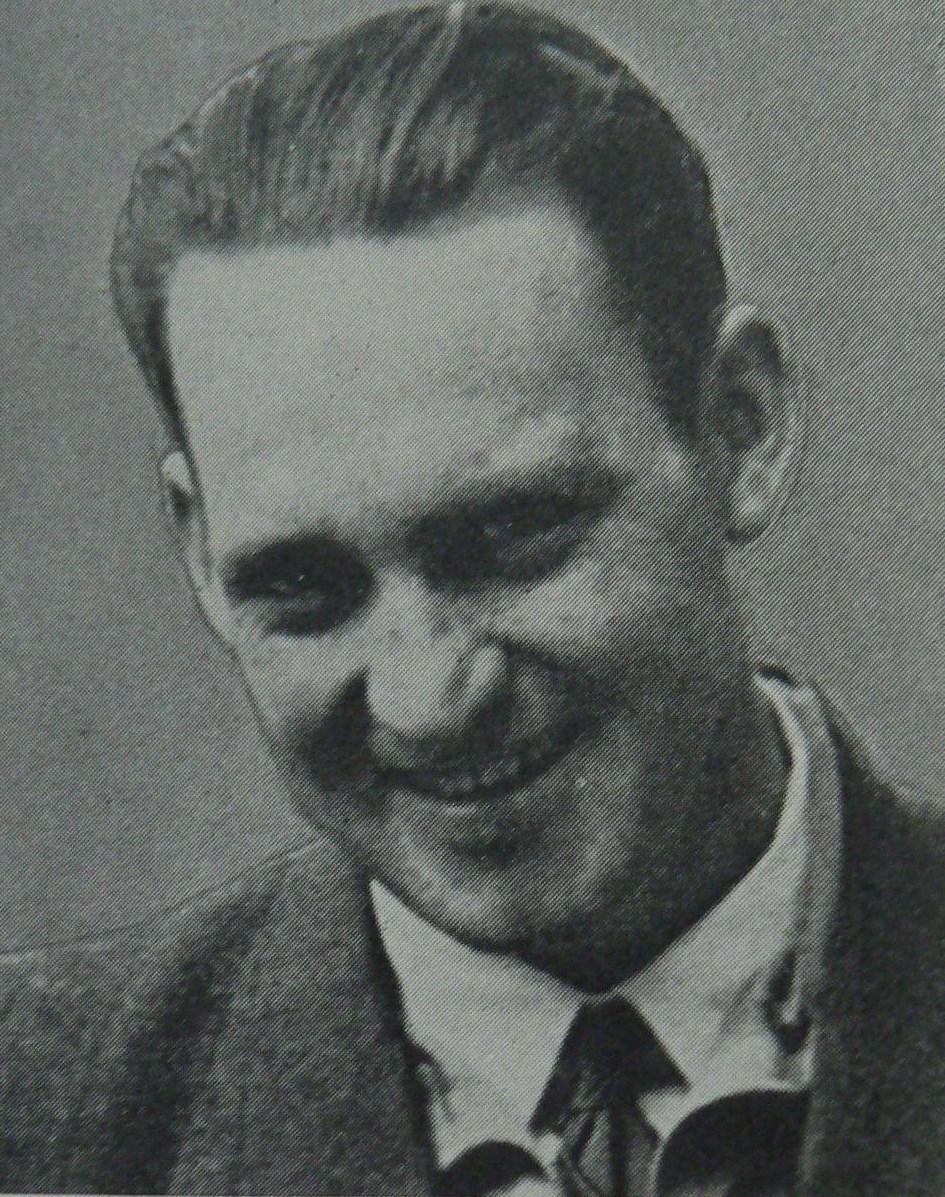
- Peder Bergenhammer Sørensen
- Born: Peder Bergenhammer Sørensen; 3 June 1914; Maribo
- Died: 29 June 1944 (aged 30); Ryvangen
- Cause of death: Execution by firing squad, gunshot wounds to the chest
- Other names: Peter Sørensen
- Occupation: Brewery worker
- Known for: Executed as member of the Danish resistance movement
- Spouse: Kirstine Fiil (married 1939–1944)
- Children: Gudrun
- Parent(s): William Bergenhammer Sørensen and Anne Petrine Nielsine Agnes née Jensen
- Website: "Modstandsdatabasen" [Resistance Database]. Peder Bergenhammer Sørensen (in Danish). Copenhagen: Nationalmuseet.

Peder Bergenhammer Sørensen (3 June 1914 – 29 June 1944) was a member of the Danish resistance executed by the German occupying power.

== Biography ==
While a brewery worker Sørensen became a member of the Hvidsten group.

The group helped the British Special Operations Executive parachute weapons and supplies into Denmark for distribution to the resistance.

In March 1944 the Gestapo made an "incredible number of arrests" including in the region of Randers Sørensen, his wife, her 17-year-old sister Gerda, her brother Niels and their father the "nationally known folklore collector and keeper of Hvidsten Inn Marius Fiil".

The following month De frie Danske reported that several arrestees from Hvidsten had been transferred from Randers to Vestre Fængsel.

On 29 June 1944 Sørensen, his father in law, his brother in law and five other members of the Hvidsten group were executed in Ryvangen.

== After his death ==
On 15 July 1944 De frie Danske reported on the execution of Sørensen, his father in law, his brother in law, the life sentence of his wife and the two-year sentence of his sister in law and lamented the profound loss of his mother in law. Six months later the January 1945 issue of the resistance newspaper Frit Danmark (Free Denmark) reported that on 29 June the previous year Sørensen and seven other named members of the Hvidsten group had been executed.

On 10 July he was together with the seven other executed group members cremated at Bispebjerg Cemetery.

In 1945 a memorial stone over the eight executed members of the Hvidsten group was raised near Hvidsten Inn.

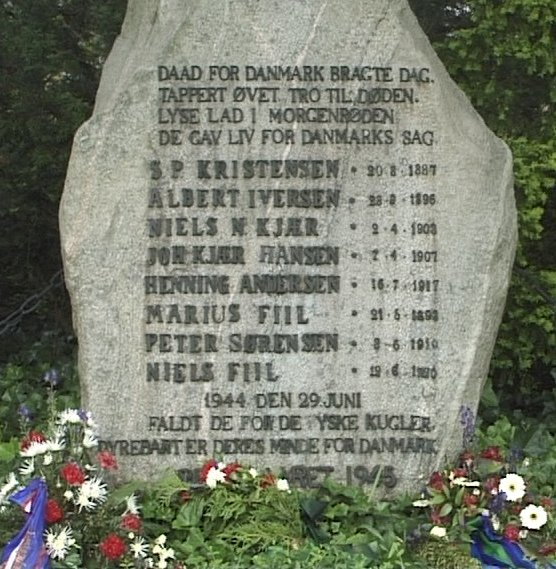
Memorial stone for the Hvidsten group in Hvidsten

Similarly a larger memorial stone for resistance members including the eight executed members of the Hvidsten group has been laid down in Ryvangen Memorial Park.

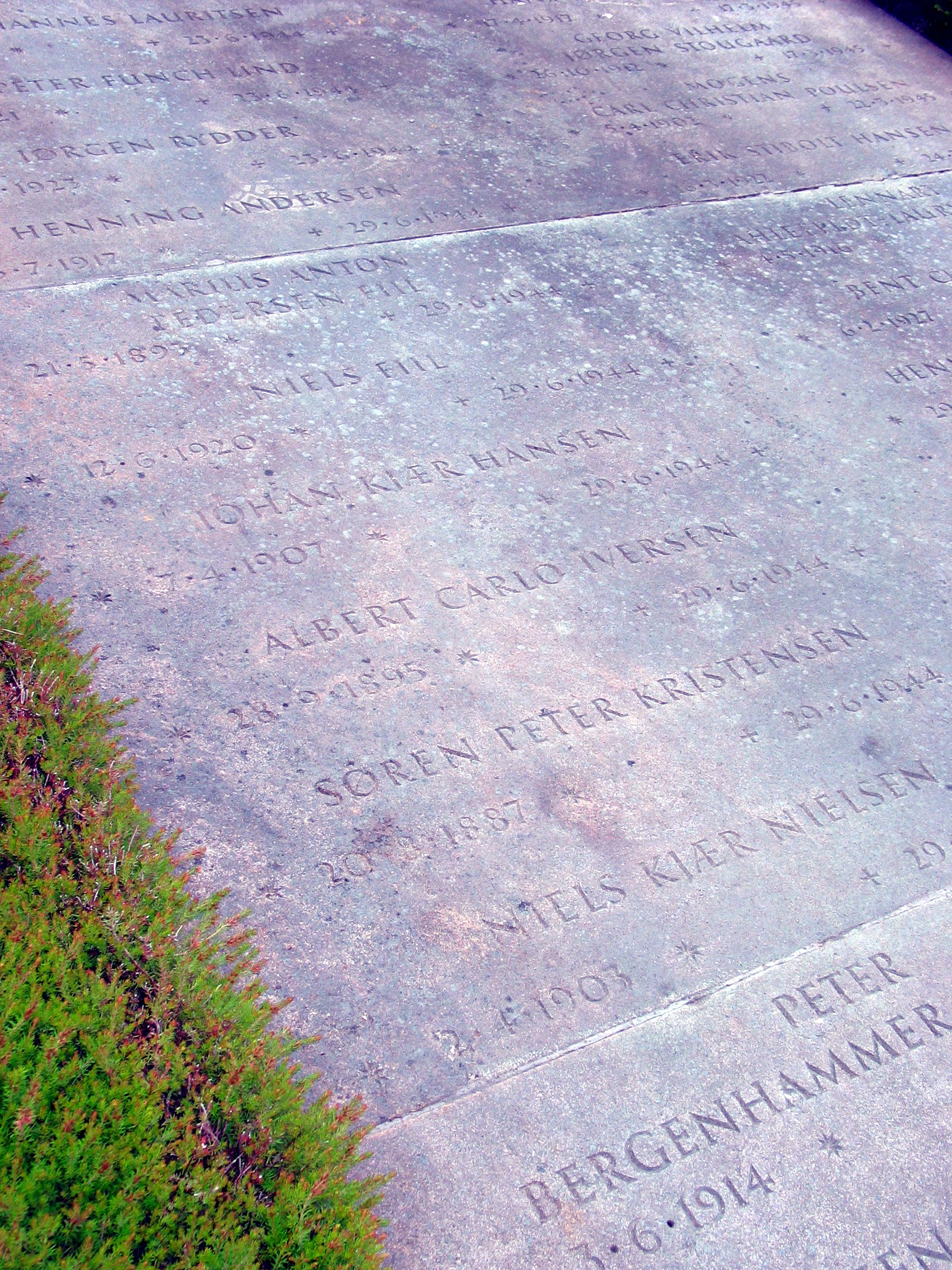
Memorial stone in Ryvangen for resistance members including the Hvidsten group

== Portrayal in the media ==
- In the 2012 Danish drama film Hvidsten Gruppen (This Life) Peder Bergenhammer Sørensen is portrayed by Jesper Riefensthal.
