= Gudrun Fiil =

Danish inn keeper

- Born: Gudrun Margrethe Kjul Kristensen; 18 or 19 December 1890; Gødstrup præstegaard, Snejbjerg, Denmark
- Died: 19 May 1972 (aged 81)
- Resting place: Spentrup cemetery
- Other names: Gudrun Margrethe Kjul Kristensen Søvang
- Occupation: Inn keeper
- Known for: Member of and widow after a member of the Danish resistance movement
- Spouse: Marius Fiil (married 1917-1944)
- Children: Kirstine Fiil; Niels Fiil; Ritta Fiil; Gerda Fiil; Bitten Fiil
- Parents: Tenant Kristen Kristensen; Kristine Bolette Kristensen
- Website: "Modstandsdatabasen" [Resistance Database]. Gudrun Fiil (in Danish). Copenhagen: Nationalmuseet.

Gudrun Fiil (18 December 1890 – 19 May 1972) was inn keeper at Hvidsten Inn and member of the Danish resistance, whose husband, son and son-in-law were executed by the German occupying power.

== Biography ==
During the occupation Fill and her family became the center of a resistance group, the Hvidsten group. With the group she helped the British Special Operations Executive parachute weapons and supplies into Denmark for distribution to the resistance.

In March 1944, the Gestapo made an "incredible number of arrests" including in the region of Randers the "nationally known folklore collector and keeper of Hvidsten inn Marius Fiil", their son Niels, their 17-year-old daughter Gerda, their daughter Kirstine and her husband brewery worker Peter Sørensen.

The following month De frie Danske reported on her husband again, that he along with other arrestees from Hvidsten had been transferred from Randers to Vestre Fængsel.

On 29 June 1944, her husband, their son Niels, their son-in-law and five other members of the Hvidsten group were executed in Ryvangen.

On 15 July 1944, De frie Danske reported on the executions, the life sentence of her older daughter and the two-year sentence of her younger daughter and compared her husband to Svend Gønge and Niels Ebbesen while lamenting her profound loss:

Our thoughts go to mrs Gudrun Fiil.
In one day and in the same bitter hour she lost her husband, her only son and son-in-law.
And her two young daughters are abducted as prisoners.
No Danish wife and mother carries a fate as heavy of sorrow and loss, pain and horror and worry.
But the veneration and devotion of the people shall support the fainting.

In the January 1945 issue of the resistance newspaper Frit Danmark (Free Denmark) reported that on 29 June 1944 the executions of the Hvidsten group members had taken place.

On 10 July 1945, her executed family members and the five other executed group members were cremated at Bispebjerg Cemetery.

As a widow she continued as keeper of the Hvidsten Inn, until her death in 1972.

== Portrayal in the media ==
In the 2012 Danish drama film Hvidsten Gruppen (This Life), Gudrun Fiil is portrayed by Bodil Jørgensen.
