= Hvidsten Group =

Danish resistance group

Hvidsten group
- Hvidstengruppen
- Leader: Marius Fiil
- Dates active: 1943 – March 1944
- Headquarters: Hvidsten Inn
- Active regions: Between Randers and Mariager
- Size: ~16
- Part of: Danish resistance movement
- Wars: the Second World War

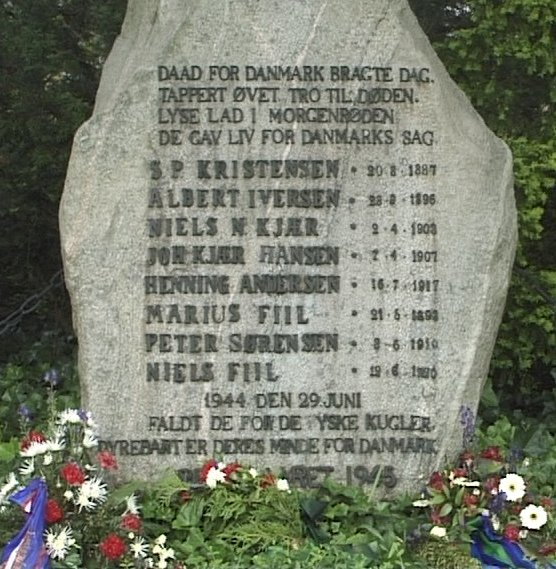
Memorial stone for the Danish resistance group Hvidstengruppen

The Whitestone Group (Danish: Hvidstengruppen) was a Danish resistance group during World War II named after the Hvidsten Inn, between Randers and Mariager in Jutland, where it was formed.

== History ==
The Hvidsten Group became connected to the resistance movement through Ole Giesler, a captain of the Special Operations Executive (SOE) who helped organise British weapons drops for the Danish Resistance. Marius Fiil, owner of the Hvidsten Inn and leader of the Hvidsten Group, met with Giesler on 12 March 1943 following an SOE drop the night before on Trinderup Heath east of Mariager that had delivered 12 to 14 containers of explosives and weapons to supply the resistance in Jutland. That evening, Fiil, with the help of his neighbour Andreas Stenz, retrieved the weapons and eventually brought them to Mustard Point, which was chosen by the Hvidsten Group as a receiving site and became one of its most reliable during the resistance effort.

The Hvidsten Group received many drops during the resistance signalled via "greetings" at the end of the BBC news broadcasts with the encoded message "Greetings to Elias - Listen again" and delivered via British Halifax planes. The Hvidsten group was responsible for pick-up at Allestrupgårds Heath and delivery of explosives to resistance groups like BOPA and Holger Danske to be used for sabotage of railways, locomotive sheds, bridges and factories in use by the German occupation forces.

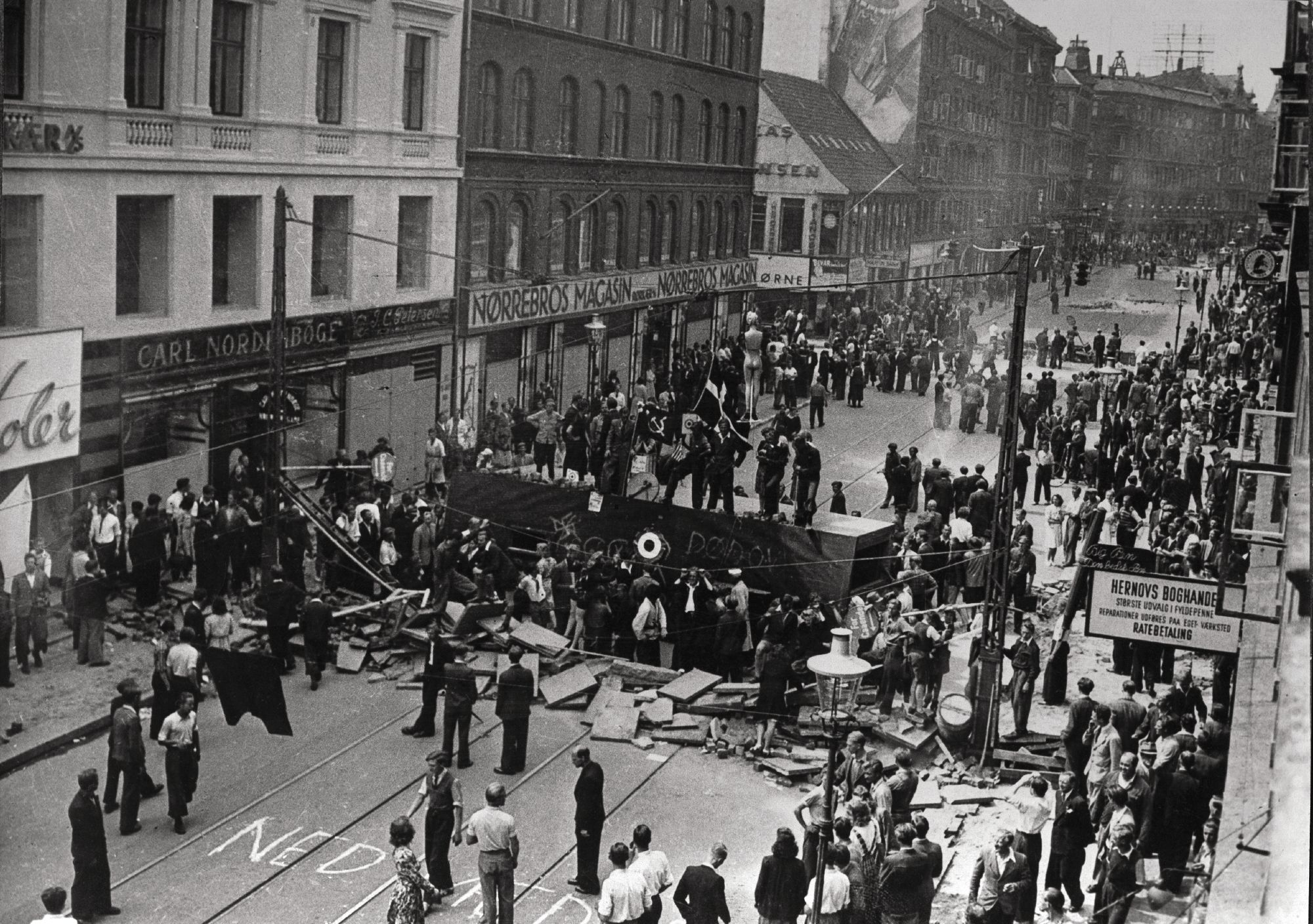
Barricades erected during a general strike, Nørrebro, Copenhagen, July 1944

=== Dismantlement of group ===
The activities of the Hvidsten Group and several other resistance groups were revealed to the Gestapo by Jacob Jensen, a British Army paratrooper employed by the SOE, after he was captured on 13th December 1943 in Aarhus and interrogated under torture. On 11 March 1944, in the early morning, the Gestapo surrounded the Hvidsten Inn and the majority of the group were arrested. Their arrest was reported by the resistance newspaper De frie Danske on 18 March 1944.

The following month De frie Danske reported that several arrestees from Hvidsten, including Marius Fiil, had been transferred from Randers to the Vestre Fængsel prison.

Eight of its members were sentenced to death on 26 June and executed by firing squad in Ryvangen on 29 June 1944, three weeks after D-day.

On 15 July 1944, De frie Danske reported on the execution of Fiil, his son and son-in-law, the life sentence imposed on his older daughter and the two-year sentence imposed on his younger daughter, and compared Fiil to historical national heroes, Svend Gønge and Niels Ebbesen, while lamenting the profound loss experienced by Fiil's widow. News of the executions contributed to an escalation of general strikes in Copenhagen. Six months later, the January 1945 issue of the resistance newspaper Frit Danmark (Free Denmark) reported that on 29 June the previous year Fiil and seven other named members of the Hvidsten group had been executed.

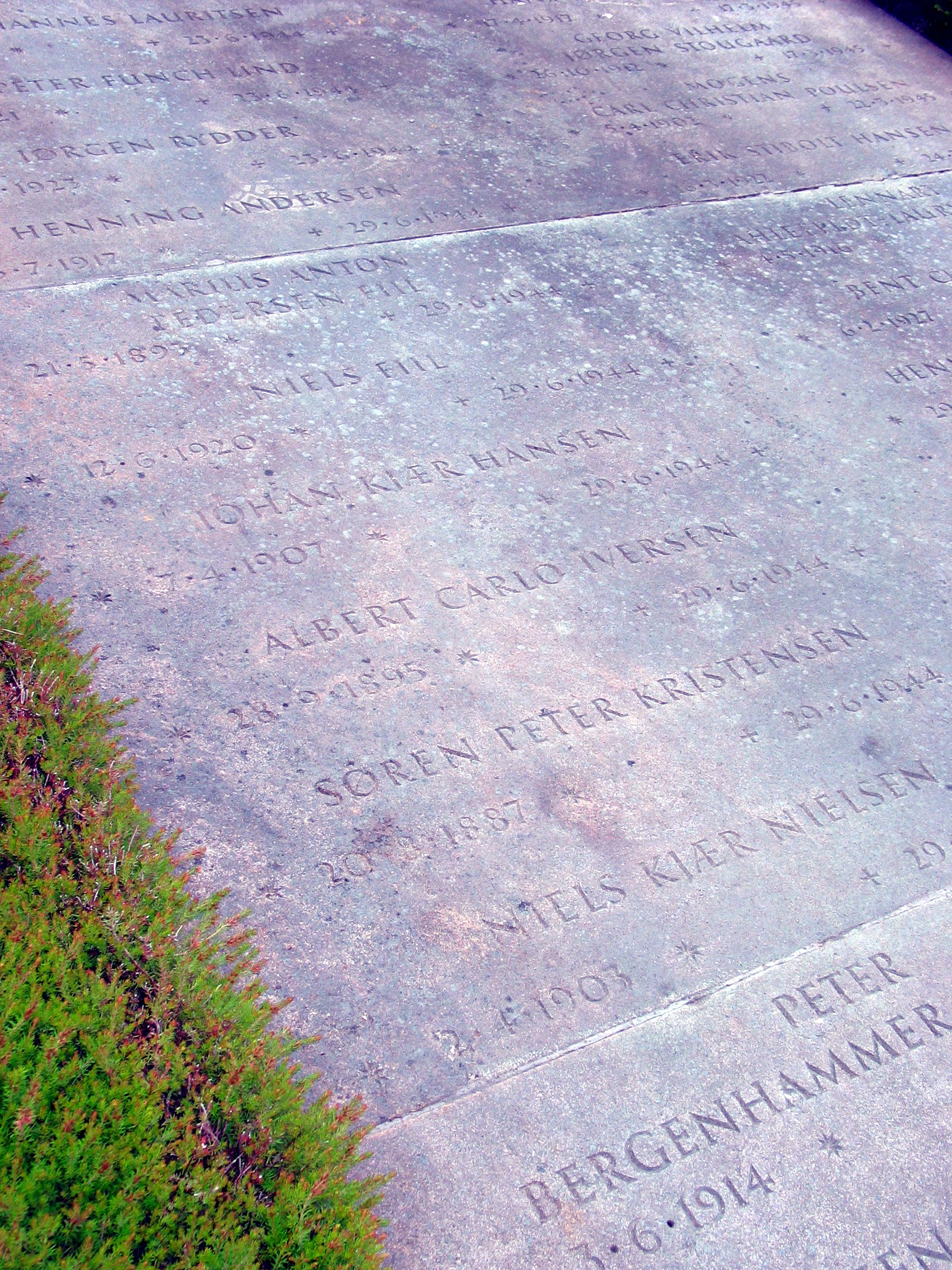
Memorial stone placed in Ryvangen Memorial Park for fallen resistance members including those of the Hvidsten group

== Members of the group and their fates ==
The following are the eight members of Hvidsten Group who were executed:

- Marius Pedersen Fiil - owner of Hvidsten Inn and Hvidsten Group leader
- Niels Fiil - son of Marius and Gudrun Fiil
- Peder Bergenhammer Sørensen - Kirstine Fiil's husband
- Johan Kjær Hansen - a mechanic
- Niels Nielsen Kjær - a radio dealer
- Søren Peter Kristensen - a coach builder
- Henning Andersen - a miller
- Albert Carlo Iversen - a veterinarian

The following members were sentenced to life in prison:

- Kirstine Fiil - daughter of Marius and Gudrun Fiil
- Jens Stenz - a farmer
- Barner Hyldegaard Andersen - a driver

The following members were given a prison sentence of four years:

- Anders Venning Steensgaard - served as a driver for the group. He was later moved to concentration camp, but survived.
- Knud Peter Buchhorn Christensen - a grocer

The following members were given a prison sentence of two years:

- Gerda Søvang Fiil - daughter of Marius and Gudrun Fiil

Other members:

- Andreas Stenz - fled to Sweden
- Svend Egon Andersen

Affiliates

- Otto Westergård Olesen - a bookseller and leading resistance member in Randers, stored the group's weapons in his bookshop, Køsters Boghandel. The weapons and supplies were then distributed to resistance members in North Jutland. Arrested in April 1944, he was interned at Frøslev Prison Camp before being deported to Dachau. Survived the war.

== Memorial ==
The bodies of the eight executed members of Hvidsten Group were found in Ryvangen, and in the summer of 1945 their remains were taken home to Hvidsten and buried 100 meters north of Hvidsten Inn, where there is now a memorial grove and a monument with the following inscription, roughly translated:

Deed for Denmark brought this day.
Bravely acted, true until death.
Let light shine in the red of morning,
They gave their lives for Denmark's cause.

S. P. KRISTENSEN * 20. 8. 1887
ALBERT IVERSEN * 28. 9. 1896
NIELS N. KJÆR * 2. 4. 1903
JOH KJÆR HANSEN * 2. 4. 1907
HENNING ANDERSEN * 16. 7. 1917
MARIUS FIIL * 21. 6. 1893
PETER SØRENSEN * 8. 6. 1919
NIELS FIIL * 12. 6. 1920

1944 on the 29 June
They fell before German bullets
Precious is their memory to Denmark
Erected in the year 1945

== Portrayal in the media ==
The Hvidsten Group is portrayed in the 2012 Danish drama film Hvidsten Gruppen (This Life).

The Hvidsten Group is referenced in 2 skin variants for the Danish Resistance skin in Call of Duty WW2.
