= Kirstine Fiil =

Danish resistance member

- Born: Kirstine Nicoline Søvang Fiil; 23 August 1918; Hvidsten, Denmark
- Died: 25 August 1983 (aged 65); Hvidsten, Denmark
- Resting place: Gassum cemetery
- Occupations: House wife, inn keeper
- Known for: Convicted member of the Danish resistance movement
- Spouses: Peder Bergenhammer Sørensen (married 1939-1944); First Lieutenant Olaf Møller (married 1946-1983)
- Children: Gudrun; Kirstine
- Parents: Marius Fiil; Gudrun Fiil
- Relatives: Niels Fiil (brother); Gerda Fiil (sister)
- Website: "Modstandsdatabasen" [Resistance Database]. Kirstine Fiil (in Danish). Copenhagen: Nationalmuseet.

Kirstine Fiil (23 August 1918 – 25 August 1983) was a convicted member of the Danish resistance as part of the Hvidsten Group, whose husband, father and brother were executed by the German occupying power.

== Biography ==
=== World War II ===
After her parents had taken over an inn, she worked there and became part of the resistance group named after it. With the group she helped the British Special Operations Executive parachute weapons and supplies into Denmark for distribution to the resistance.

In March 1944 the Gestapo made an "incredible number of arrests" including in the region of Randers herself, her father the "nationally known folklore collector and keeper of Hvidsten inn Marius Fiil", her husband Peter Sørensen, her brother Niels Fiil and her 17-year-old sister Gerda, and Fiil's infant daughter was thus separated from both parents. The following month De frie Danske reported on her father again, that he along with other arrestees from Hvidsten had been transferred from Randers to Vestre Fængsel. In June 1944 a court martial gave Fiil a death sentence but then commuted it to life imprisonment. On 29 June 1944 her father, husband and brother and five other members of the Hvidsten group were executed in Ryvangen.

On 15 July 1944 De frie Danske reported on the executions, her life sentence and the two-year sentence of her sister Gerda and compared her father to Svend Gønge and Niels Ebbesen. Fiil and her sister were imprisoned separately in Germany, but for some time she was imprisoned there together with Monica Wichfeld. In April 1945 Fiil's mother succeed after several attempts to get a pardon for her and she was evacuated with the White Buses. Upon reaching the Danish border town Padborg she was set free and met by her mother and the sister Gerda, who had previously been pardoned. On 2 July 1945 the remains of her father and brother were found in Ryvangen and transferred to the Department of Forensic Medicine of the university of Copenhagen. The remains of her husband and the five other executed members of the group were found in the same area three days later. The following inquests showed that they had been executed with gunshot wounds to the chest. On 10 July 1945 her executed family members and the five other executed group members were cremated at Bispebjerg Cemetery.

In 1946 in Finderup on the day she turned 28 she married again, to divorced first lieutenant and concentration camp survivor Olaf Møller and she took up the work at Hvidsten Inn again. On 27 February 1949 she gave birth to a girl that died the same day, after the midwife baptized her Kirstine Fiil Møller. The newborn girl was buried Ash Wednesday in Gassum. Kirstine Fiil died in Hvidsten on 25 August 1983, survived by her husband by then a retired colonel.

== Portrayal in the media ==
- In the 2012 Danish drama film Hvidsten Gruppen (This Life) Kirstine Fiil is portrayed by Marie Bach Hansen.
