= Gerda Fiil =

Danish resistance member (1927–1994)

- Born: Gerda Søvang Fiil; 30 January 1927; Hvidsten, Denmark
- Died: 26 June 1994 (aged 67); Hvidsten, Denmark
- Resting place: Spentrup cemetery
- Other names: Gerda Søvang Jessen
- Occupation: Waitress
- Known for: Convicted member of the Danish resistance movement
- Spouse: Svend Jessen (married until 1994)
- Parents: Marius Fiil; Gudrun Fiil
- Relatives: Kirstine Fiil (sister); Niels Fiil (brother)
- Website: "Modstandsdatabasen" [Resistance Database]. Gerda Fiil (in Danish). Copenhagen: Nationalmuseet.

Gerda Søvang Fiil (30 January 1927 – 26 June 1994) was a convicted member of the Danish resistance, whose father and brother were executed by the German occupying power.

== Biography ==
During the later stage of the occupation the Fiil family and other locals formed a resistance group, the Hvidsten group. With the group, she helped the British Special Operations Executive parachute weapons and supplies into Denmark for distribution to the resistance.

In March 1944, the Gestapo made an "incredible number of arrests" including in the region of Randers herself, her father the "nationally known folklore collector and keeper of Hvidsten inn Marius Fiil", her brother Niels Fiil, her oldest sister Kirstine and her brother-in-law Peter Sørensen.

The following month De frie Danske reported on her father again, that he along with other arrestees from Hvidsten had been transferred from Randers to Vestre Fængsel.

In June 1944, a court martial sentenced Fiil to two years in a juvenile prison.

On 29 June 1944, her father, brother and brother-in-law and five other members of the Hvidsten group were executed in Ryvangen.

On 15 July 1944, De frie Danske reported on the executions, her two-year prison sentence and the life sentence of her sister Kirstine and compared her father to Svend Gønge and Niels Ebbesen.

Fiil and her sister were imprisoned separately in Germany, but she was soon after pardoned and returned to Denmark. In April 1945, Fiil was therefore able to join her mother in receiving her older sister in the Danish border town Padborg, to which Kirstine had been evacuated with the White Buses after also receiving a pardon.

On 10 July 1945 her executed family members and the five other executed group members were cremated at Bispebjerg Cemetery.

Gerda Fiil died in Hvidsten on 26 June 1994, survived by her husband Svend Jessen. They are both buried in Spentrup cemetery.

== Portrayal in the media ==
- In the 2012 Danish drama film Hvidsten Gruppen (This Life) Gerda Fiil is portrayed by Laura Winther Møller.
