= Marius Fiil =

Danish resistance leader (1893–1944)

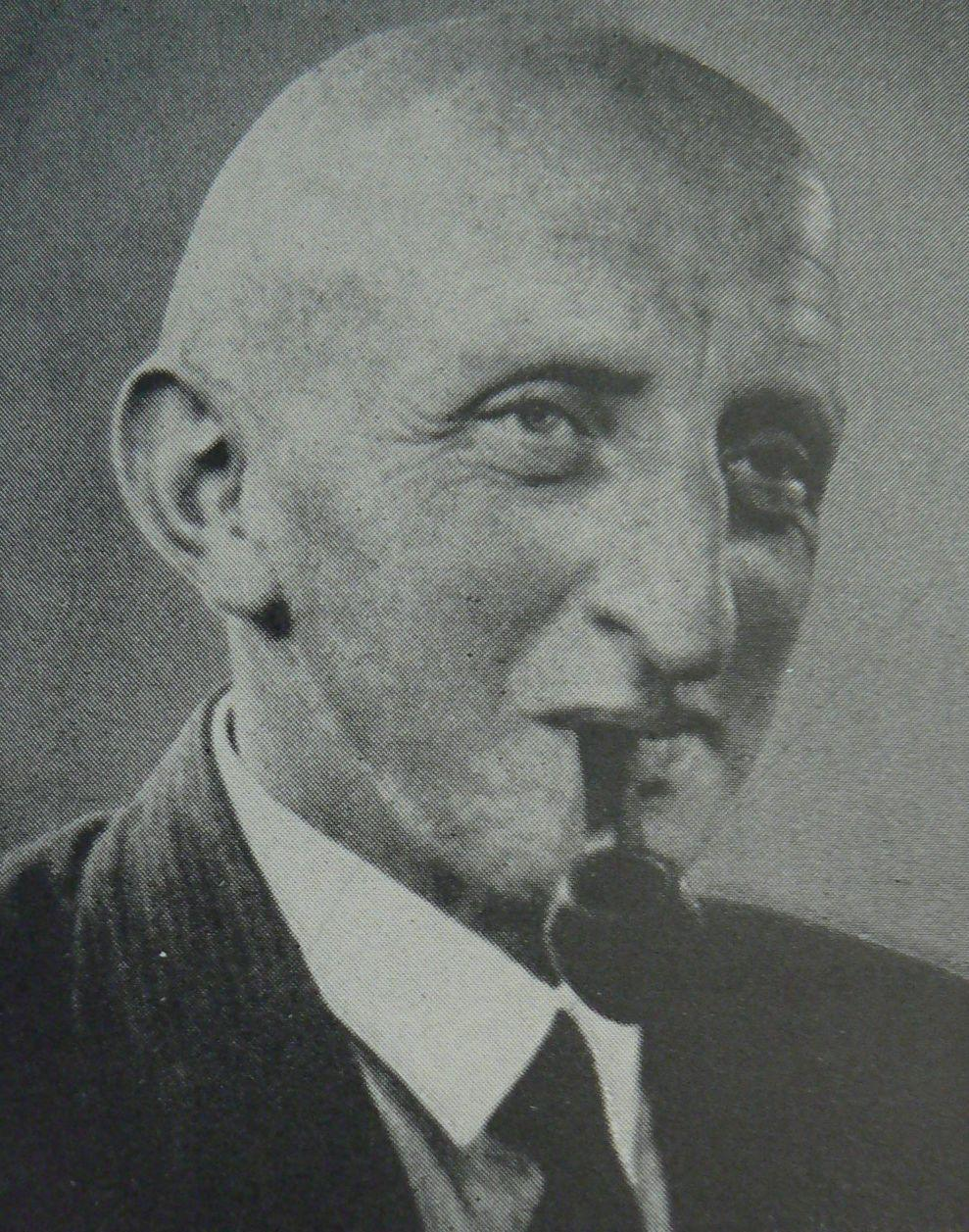
- Marius Fiil
- Born: Marius Anton Pedersen Fiil; 21 May 1893; Hvidsten Inn, Denmark
- Died: 29 June 1944 (aged 51); Ryvangen, Denmark
- Cause of death: Execution by firing squad, gunshot wounds to the chest
- Resting place: Bispebjerg Cemetery
- Occupations: Inn keeper, Agriculture
- Known for: Executed as member of the Danish resistance movement
- Spouse: Gudrun Fiil (married 1917–1944)
- Children: Kirstine Fiil; Niels Fiil; Ritta Fiil; Gerda Fiil; Bitten Fiil
- Parents: Niels Pedersen (Fiil); Nicoline Mathilde Pedersen
- Website: "Modstandsdatabasen" [Resistance Database]. Marius Fiil (in Danish). Copenhagen: Nationalmuseet.

Marius Anton Pedersen Fiil (21 May 1893 – 29 June 1944) was the inn keeper at Hvidsten Inn and one of leader's of the Danish resistance, for which he was executed by the occupying Nazis.

== Biography ==
Marius Anton Pedersen Fiil was born in the Hvidsten Inn on 21 May 1893.

During the occupation of Denmark, Fiil and his family became the center of a resistance group, the Hvidsten group. The group helped the British Special Operations Executive parachute weapons and supplies into Denmark for distribution to the resistance.

In March 1944 the Gestapo made an "incredible number of arrests" including in the region of Randers the "nationally known folklore collector and keeper of Hvidsten inn Marius Fiil", his son Niels, his 17-year-old daughter Gerda, his daughter Kirstine and her husband brewery worker Peter Sørensen.

The following month De frie Danske reported on Fiil again, that he along with other arrestees from Hvidsten had been transferred from Randers to Vestre Fængsel. His group would also continue to receive British supply drops until their apprehension.

On 29 June 1944 Fiil, his son Niels, his son-in-law and five other members of the Hvidsten group were executed in Ryvangen, a neighborhood in Copenhagen.

== Legacy ==
On 15 July 1944, De frie Danske reported on the execution of Fiil, his son and son-in-law, the life sentence of his older daughter and the two-year sentence of his younger daughter and compared Fiil to Svend Gønge and Niels Ebbesen while lamenting the profound loss of Fiil's widow. Six months later the January 1945 issue of the resistance newspaper Frit Danmark (Free Denmark) reported that on 29 June the previous year Fiil and seven other named members of the Hvidsten group had been executed.

On 10 July he was together with the seven other executed group members cremated at Bispebjerg Cemetery.

In 1945 a memorial stone over the eight executed members of the Hvidsten group was raised near Hvidsten Inn.

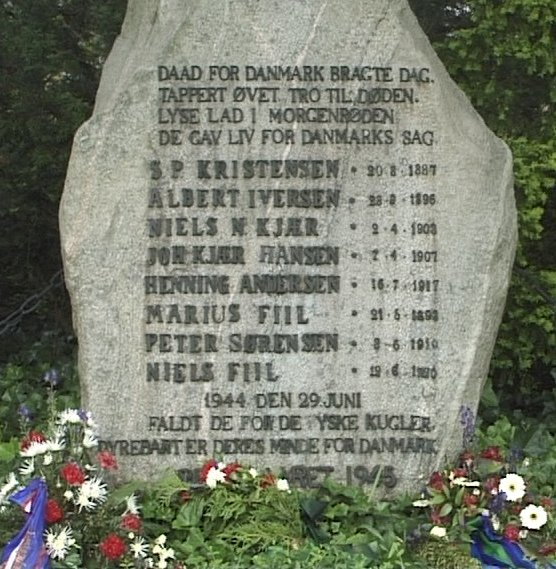
Memorial stone for the Hvidsten group in Hvidsten

Similarly a larger memorial stone for resistance members including the eight executed members of the Hvidsten group has been laid down in Ryvangen Memorial Park.

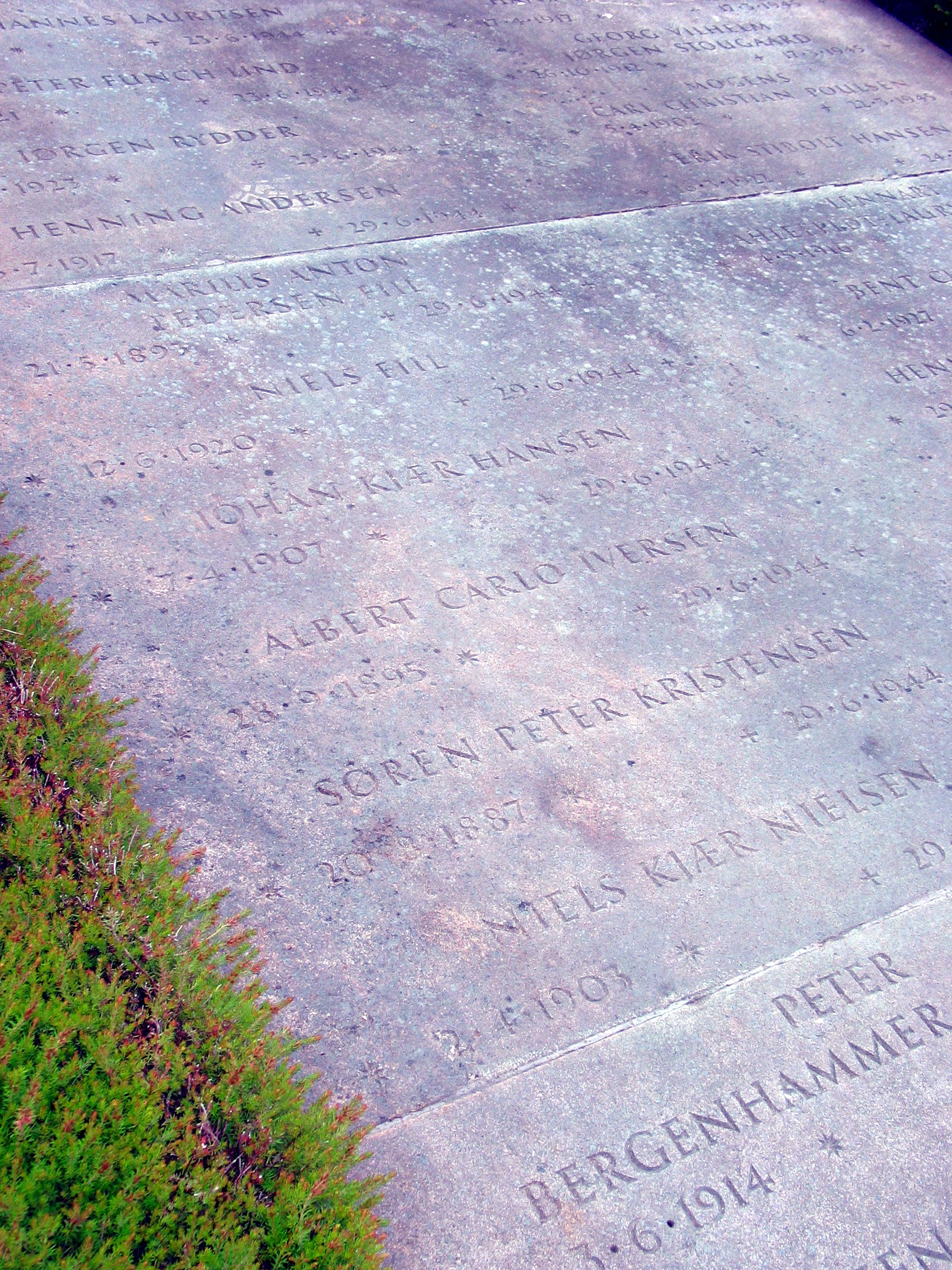
Memorial stone in Ryvangen for resistance members including the Hvidsten group

== Portrayal in the media ==
- In the 2012 Danish drama film Hvidsten Gruppen (This Life), Marius Fiil is portrayed by Jens Jørn Spottag.

== External Sources ==
- Holm, Axel (1945). Hvidsten-Gruppen [The Hvidsten Group] (in Danish). Aarhus: Gravers Andersens Forlag. 142 pages. OCLC 492247465. Archived from the original on 2007-09-19.
- Røjel, Jørgen (1984). Modstandsgruppen Hvidsten [The resistance group Hvidsten] (in Danish). Copenhagen: Samleren. 249 pages. ISBN 87-568-0743-0. OCLC 13424058.
