= Niels Fiil =

Danish resistance member (1920–1944)

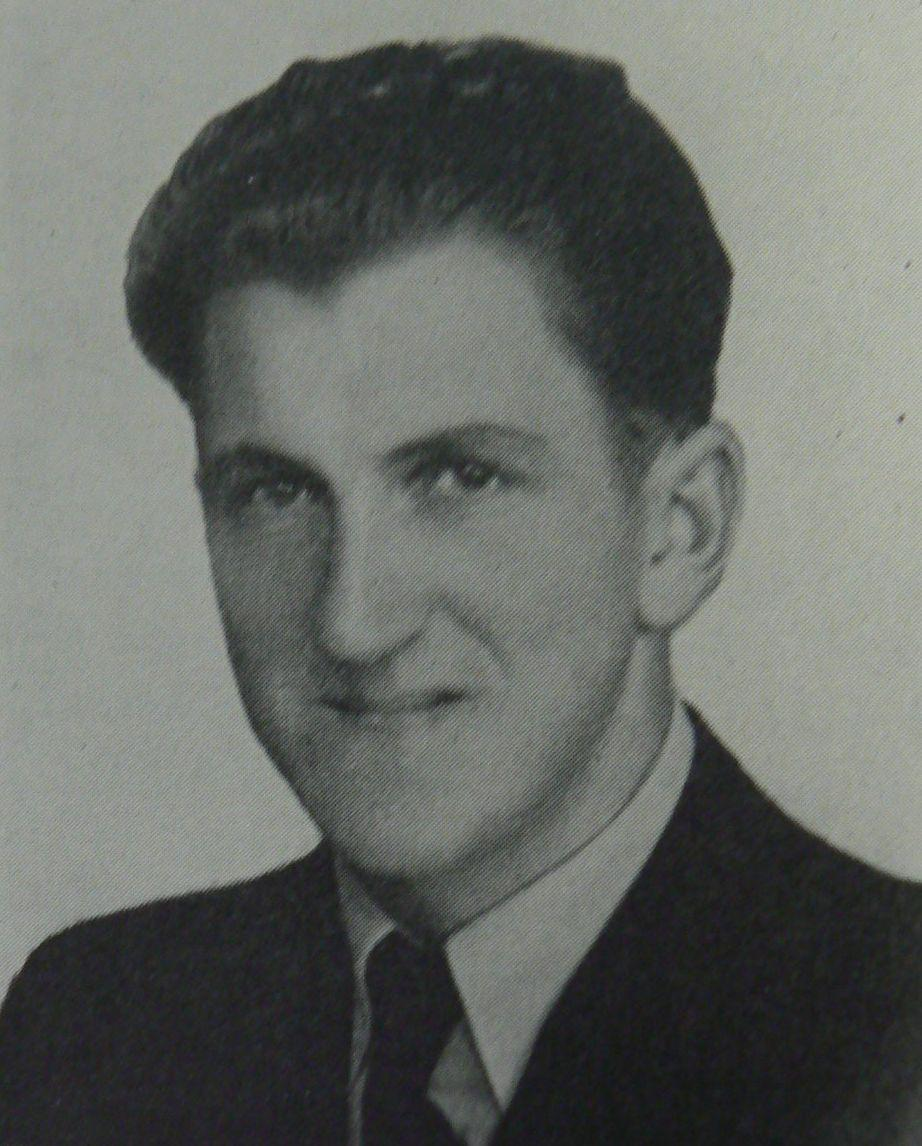
- Born: 12 June 1920; Hvidsten
- Died: 29 June 1944 (aged 24); Ryvangen
- Cause of death: Execution by firing squad,
- Occupation(s): Farmer, Inn assistant
- Known for: Executed as member of the Danish resistance movement
- Parent(s): Marius and Gudrun Fiil
- Relatives: Kirstine Fiil (sister); Gerda Fiil (sister)
- Website: "Modstandsdatabasen" [Resistance Database]. Niels Fiil (in Danish). Copenhagen: Nationalmuseet.

Niels Fiil (12 June 1920 – 29 June 1944) was a member of the Danish resistance executed by the German occupying power.

== Biography ==
In addition to being a member of the Hvidsten group, Fiil was also a farmer while helping out at the inn.

The group helped the British Special Operations Executive parachute weapons and supplies into Denmark for distribution to the resistance.

In March 1944 the Gestapo made an "incredible number of arrests" in the region of Randers, which included Fiil, his father Marius, his 17-year-old sister Gerda, his sister Kirstine and her husband brewery worker Peter Sørensen.

The following month De frie Danske reported that several arrestees from Hvidsten had been transferred from Randers to Vestre Fængsel.

On 29 June 1944 Fiil, his father Marius, his brother-in-law and five other members of the Hvidsten group were executed in Ryvangen, a neighborhood in Copenhagen.

== After his death ==
On 15 July 1944 De frie Danske reported on the execution of Fiil, his father and brother son in law, the life sentence of his older sister and the two-year sentence of his younger sister and lamented the profound loss of Fiil's mother. Six months later the January 1945 issue of the resistance newspaper Frit Danmark (Free Denmark) reported that on 29 June the previous year Fiil and seven other named members of the Hvidsten group had been executed.

On 10 July he was together with the seven other executed group members cremated at Bispebjerg Cemetery.

In 1945 a memorial stone over the eight executed members of the Hvidsten group was raised near Hvidsten kro.

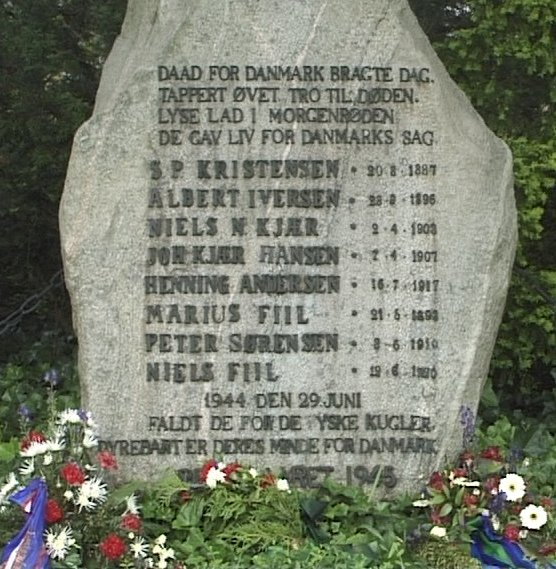
Memorial stone for the Hvidsten group in Hvidsten

Similarly a larger memorial stone for resistance members including the eight executed members of the Hvidsten group has been laid down in Ryvangen Memorial Park.

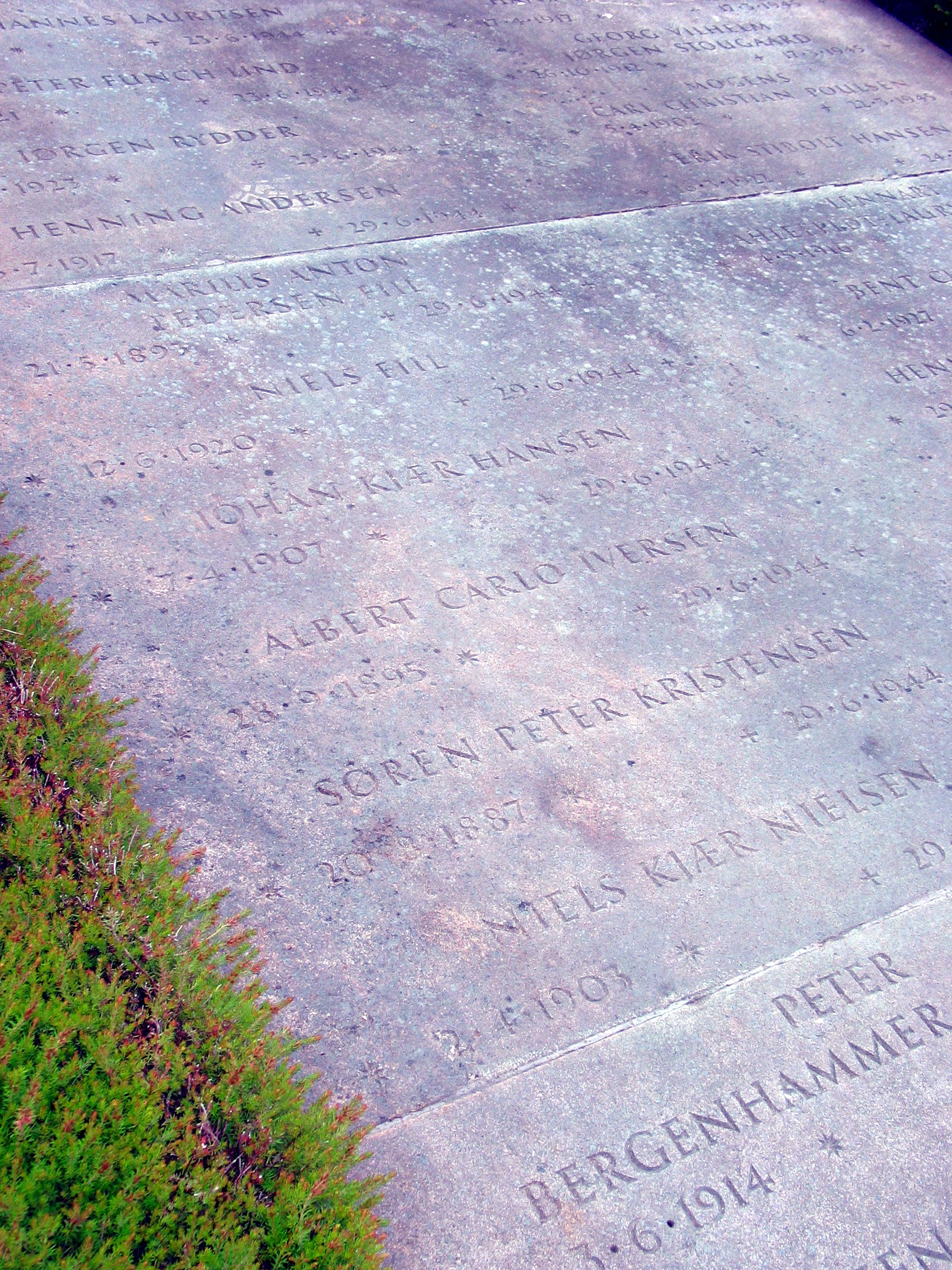
Memorial stone in Ryvangen for resistance members including the Hvidsten group

== Portrayal in the media ==
- In the 2012 Danish drama film Hvidsten Gruppen (This Life) Niels Fiil is portrayed by Thomas Ernst.
