= This Life (film) =

2012 Danish drama film

- Theatrical poster
- Directed by: Anne-Grethe Bjarup Riis
- Written by: Ib Kastrup; Jørgen Kastrup; Regner Grasten
- Produced by: Regner Grasten
- Starring: Jens Jørn Spottag; Bodil Jørgensen
- Cinematography: Morten Bruun
- Edited by: Klaus Heinecke; Anders Refn; Jacob Thorndahl; Martin Wehding
- Music by: Simon Ravn
- Production company: Regner Grasten Film
- Distributed by: United International Pictures
- Release date: 1 March 2012
- Running time: 122 minutes
- Country: Denmark
- Language: Danish

This Life (Danish: Hvidsten gruppen) is a 2012 Danish drama film based on the activities of the Hvidsten Group, a Danish resistance group in World War II.

== Cast ==
- Jens Jørn Spottag as Marius Fiil
- Bodil Jørgensen as Gudrun Fiil
- Thomas Ernst as Niels Fiil
- Marie Bach Hansen as Tulle Fiil
- Laura Winther Møller as Gerda Fiil
- Mia Ejlerskov as Bitten Fiil
- Bjarne Henriksen as Albert Carlo Iversen
- Jesper Riefensthal as Peder Bergenhammer Sørensen
- Henrik Vestergaard as Johan Kjær Hansen
- Niels Lund Boesen as Niels Nielsen Kjær
- Arne Siemsen as Søren Peter Kristensen
- Janus Kim Elsig as Henning Andersen
