= Andreas Kjær (scientist) =

Danish physician-scientist (born 1963)

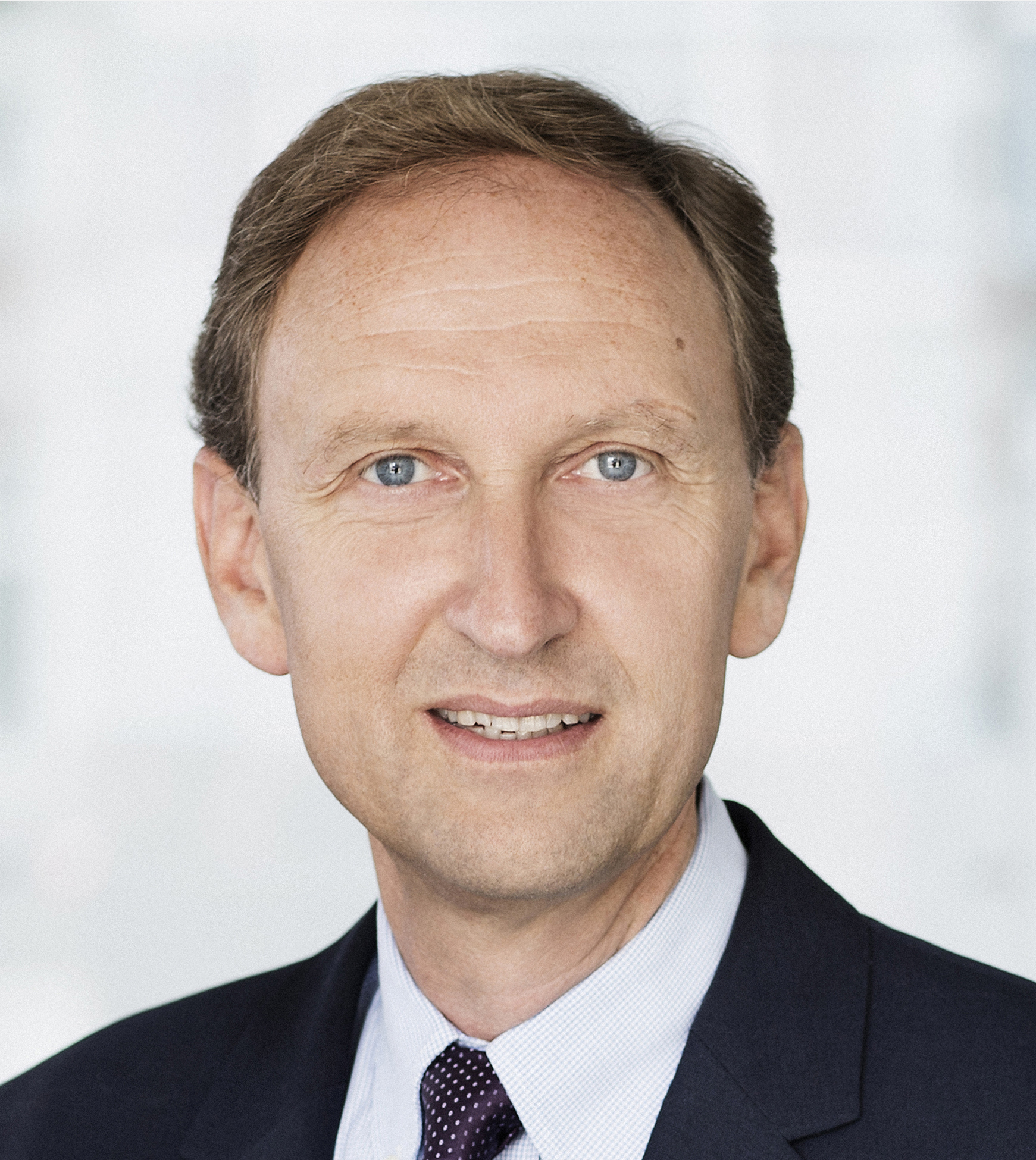
- Born: April 12, 1963; Copenhagen, Denmark
- Awards: ERC advanced grant (2014); Pasteur Prize (2011); August Krogh Prize (2006)
- Scientific career
- Fields: Nuclear Medicine, Molecular Imaging, Positron Emission Tomography (PET), PET/MR, Theranostics, Radionuclide therapy
- Institutions: University of Copenhagen & Rigshospitalet, the National University Hospital

Andreas Kjær (born April 12, 1963) is a Danish physician-scientist and European Research Council (ERC) advanced grantee. He is professor at the University of Copenhagen and chief physician at Rigshospitalet, the National University Hospital of Denmark. He is board certified in Nuclear Medicine and his research is focused on molecular imaging with PET and PET/MRI and targeted radionuclide therapies (theranostics) in cancer. His achievements include development of several new PET tracers that have reached first-in-human clinical use. He has published more than 400 peer-review articles, filed 10 patents, supervised more than 40 PhD students and received numerous prestigious scientific awards over the years. He is a member of the Danish Academy of Technical Sciences

== Education and employment ==
Professor Kjær received his MD degree from the University of Copenhagen in 1989 and the same year he received the United States ECFMG license as MD. In 1994 he obtained the PhD degree, in 1996 the DMSc degree and in 2000 he was board certified as specialist in Nuclear Medicine. He was appointed full professor and chief physician in 2003. He has been a visiting scientist at Salk Institute (La Jolla) and Emory University (Atlanta). He is currently director of the PhD program for Medical & Molecular Imaging at University of Copenhagen. He obtained the MBA (executive) degree from Copenhagen Business School in 1997 and participated in "Leading the virtual company" program at Harvard Business School (Boston) from 2013-14. He also served as medical officer in the Royal Danish Navy (first lieutenant 1989, lieutenant commander 1994).

== Honors, awards and positions of trust ==
Kjær received numerous awards over the years. Examples include the August Krogh Prize (Organization of Danish Medical Societies, 2006), Great Prize for Scientific Achievements (Scandinavian Society of Clinical Physiology and Nuclear Medicine, 2007), Global Excellence in Health Prize (2010) and the Pasteur Prize (Danish National Advanced Technology Foundation, 2011). In 2014 he was awarded an ERC advanced grant and in 2015 he was appointed member of the Danish Academy of Technical Sciences. He served as president of the Scandinavian Society for Clinical Physiology and Nuclear Medicine (SSCPNM) 2006-12 and currently is editor-in-chief of Diagnostics (Basel) as well as on advisory boards and committees.

== Research focus and major contributions ==
Kjær's research has focused on translational molecular imaging in with PET and PET/MRI and on development of targeted radionuclide therapies (theranostics) for use in precision medicine in cancer. In addition, the use of molecular imaging for study of pathophysiology in other diseases, e.g. atherosclerosis, has been a major focus. Notable achievements of his research group include development of several new PET tracers that have reached first-in-human clinical use. Examples include first-in-humans with urokinase plasminogen activator receptor (uPAR)-PET, a marker of cancer aggressiveness (^{68}Ga-NOTA-AE105 and ^{64}Cu-DOTA-AE105) and first-in-humans with ^{64}Cu-DOTATATE for somatostatin receptor imaging in neuroendocrine tumors. His group also demonstrated the prognostic value of FDG-PET in neuroendocrine tumor patients and were first to combine ^{13}C-hyperpolarized MRSI and PET on a clinical PET/MRI scanner, a technique they named hyperPET. Recently his group developed and demonstrated the feasibility of uPAR-targeted optical imaging for cancer surgery guidance
