= Hvidsten Inn =

Historic inn in Hvidsten, Denmark

- Hvidsten Kro
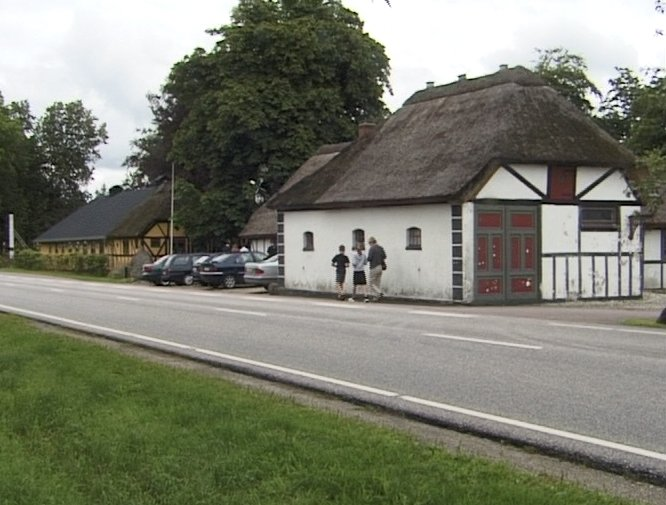
- Hvidsten Inn seen from the road
- Interactive map of the Hvidsten Inn area

General information
- Location: Mariagervej 450, Randers, Hvidsten, Denmark
- Coordinates: 56.550111°N 10.002192°E

Website
- http://www.hvidstenkro.dk/

Hvidsten Inn (Danish: Hvidsten Kro) is a historic, listed inn, formerly a coaching inn located in Hvidsten between Randers and Mariager.

Today the inn consists of five buildings of which the oldest is the travellers stable from 1790.

A notable inn keeper was Marius Fiil who in 1893 was born in the inn as son of its owner then, Niels Pedersen (Fiil) and who was keeper of the inn from 1925 to 1944.

In 1943 Hvidsten Inn became the center for the Hvidsten group, which was part of the Danish resistance movement.

The following year the Gestapo arrested most of the group's members, including the inn keeper and his assistant son who were executed on 29 June 1944 leaving behind the widow Gudrun Fiil who took over the inn.

In 1945 a memorial stone over the executed members of the Hvidsten group was raised near the inn.

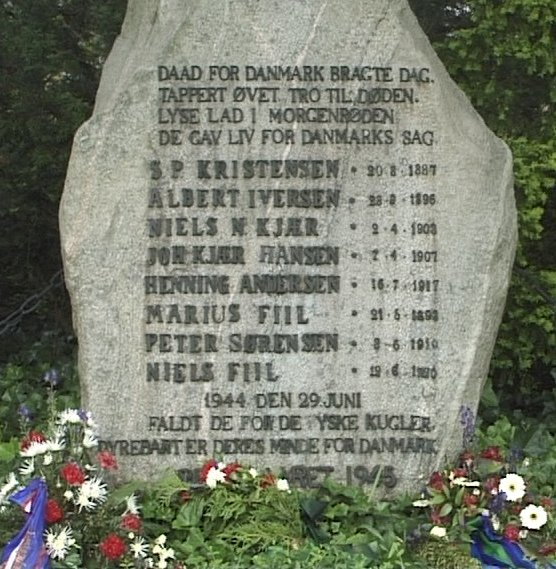
Memorial stone for the Hvidsten group in Hvidsten

In 1984 the Danish postal service introduced a stamp depicting Hvidsten Inn in the hand of Arne Kühlmann.

== Portrayal in the media ==
- The 2012 Danish drama film Hvidsten Gruppen (This Life) takes place in and around Hvidsten Inn.
