= De frie Danske =

Danish newspaper (1941–1945)

- Type: Monthly newspaper
- Founded: December 1941
- Ceased publication: 24 May 1945
- Political alignment: Non-communist
- Language: Danish
- Headquarters: Copenhagen
- Country: Denmark

De frie Danske (Danish: The Free Danes) was a Danish resistance newspaper published in Copenhagen about monthly from December 1941 to 24 May 1945. It was the first Danish non-communist resistance newspaper and the first to bring photographs. It was also one of the largest, with final issues reaching a circulation of 20,000. Especially notable was the June 1944 Invasion Issue titled 'The Free Danes Welcome our Allied Friends' with a four colored front-page photo of one United States and one British rifleman each in front of their national flags.

Resistance activist Edith Bonnesen contributed to the publication of the paper.

== In popular culture ==
De frie Danske appears in Lois Lowry's historical novel Number the Stars.
