= Vestre Prison =

Prison in Copenhagen, Denmark

Coordinates: 55°39′42″N 12°32′15″E

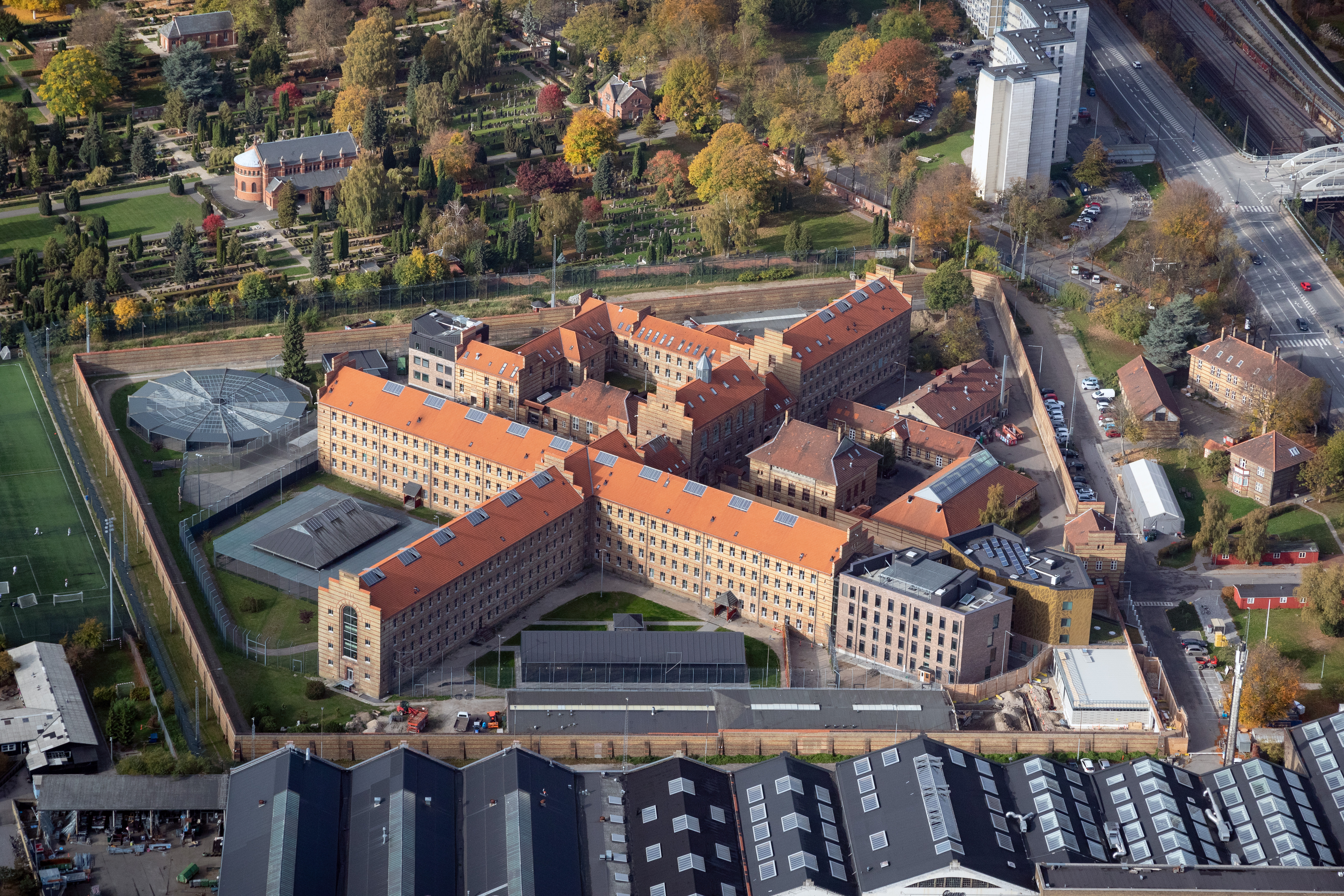
- Interactive map of Vestre Prison
- Location: Copenhagen
- Security class: Internment
- Capacity: 530 (940 during COP15)
- Opened: 1895
- Managed by: Correctional Service of Denmark

Vestre Prison (Danish: Vestre Fængsel, Western Prison) is the main jail of the Danish capital, Copenhagen. Erected in 1895, it is Denmark's largest prison with a total capacity of 530 inmates. It primarily houses pretrial detainees, not convicted felons.

== History ==
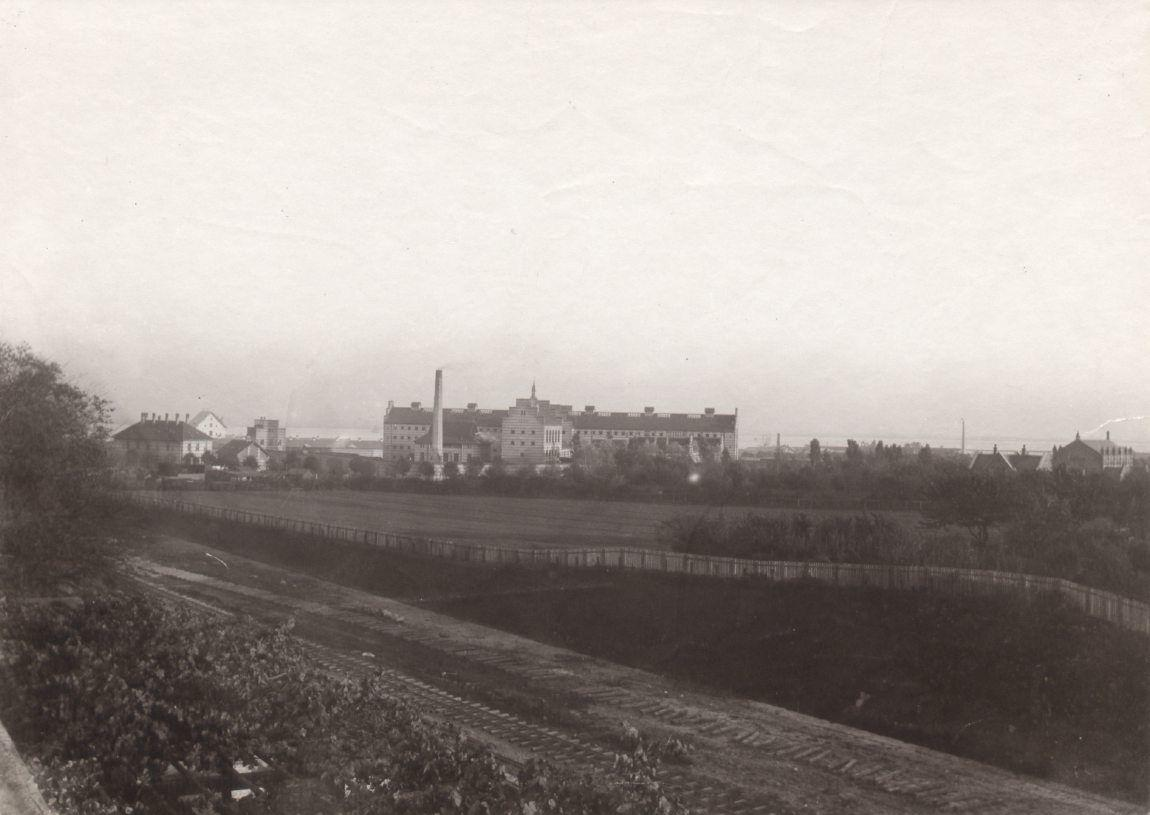
The prison seen from Old Carlsberg in 1896

Vestre Fængsel opened in 1895. The building was designed by city architect Ludvig Fenger.

During much of the German occupation of Denmark, Vestre Fængsel was operated by German police.

== Cultural references ==
- Vestre Prison is used as location in the films De røde enge (1945), Mosekongen (1950), I kongens klær (1954), Den forsvundne fuldmægtig (1971), Mig og Mafiaen (1973), Olsen-banden går amok (1973), Krummerne 3 - Fars gode idé (1994), Anklaget (2005) and Winnie og Karina går til filmen (2009).
- Vestre Prison is used as a location at 1:20:23 in the 1974 Olsen-banden film The Last Exploits of the Olsen Gang.
- Vestre Fængsel is the title of a 1996 adaption by Finn & Jacob of a John Phillips song.
- In his 2015 breakthrough single Tyveri, Danish singer Hasan Shah sings "Hvis jeg havner i Vestre Fængsel..." (English: If I end up in Vestre Fængsel...").
- French author Louis-Ferdinand Céline spent more than one year at Vestre starting in 1946 and tell of his ordeal in book 1 of Féerie pour une autre fois .
