= Kaj Munk =

Danish playwright and pastor (1898–1944)

The Reverend Kaj Munk
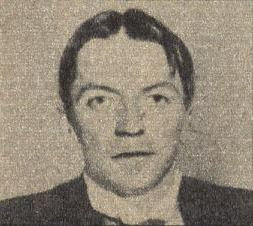
- Photo of Kaj Munk published in the De Wervelwind, February 1944
- Born: Kaj Harald Leininger Munk; 13 January 1898; Lolland, Denmark
- Died: 4 January 1944 (aged 45); Hørbylunde near Silkeborg, Denmark
- Occupations: Playwright and Lutheran pastor
- Writing career
- Notable works: Pilatus, Ordet, Kærlighed

Kaj Harald Leininger Munk (commonly called Kaj Munk; 13 January 1898 – 4 January 1944) was a Danish playwright and Lutheran pastor, known for his cultural engagement and his martyrdom during the occupation of Denmark of World War II. He is commemorated as a martyr in the Calendar of Saints of the Lutheran Church on 14 August, alongside Maximilian Kolbe.

== Biography ==
He was born Kaj Harald Leininger Petersen on the island of Lolland, Denmark, and raised by a family named Munk after the death of his parents. From 1924 until his death, Munk was the vicar in the small village of Vedersø in Western Jutland. Munk's plays were mostly performed and made public during the 1930s, although many were written in the 1920s. Much of his other work concerns the "philosophy-on-life debate" (religion—Marxism—Darwinism) which marked much of Danish cultural life during this period.

On one occasion, in the early 1930s, in a comment that came back to haunt him in later years, Munk expressed admiration for Hitler (for uniting Germans) and wished a similar unifying figure for Danes. However, Munk's attitude towards Hitler (and Mussolini) turned to outspoken criticism as he witnessed Hitler's persecution of the German Jewish community, and Mussolini's conduct of the war in Ethiopia. In 1938, the Danish newspaper Jyllands-Posten published on its front page an open letter to Benito Mussolini written by Kaj Munk criticising the persecutions against Jews.

Early on, Munk was a strong opponent of the German Occupation of Denmark (1940–1945), although he continually opposed the idea of democracy as such, preferring the idea of a "Nordic dictator" who should unite the Nordic countries and keep them neutral during periods of international crisis. His plays Han sidder ved Smeltediglen ("He sits by the melting pot") and Niels Ebbesen were direct attacks on Nazism. The latter, centering on the figure of Niels Ebbesen, a medieval Danish squire considered a national hero for having assassinated an earlier German occupier of Denmark, Count Gerhard III, was a contemporary analogue to World War II-era Denmark. Despite his friends urging Munk to go underground, he continued to preach against Danes who collaborated with the Nazis.

The Gestapo arrested Munk on the night of 4 January 1944, a month after he had defied a Nazi ban and preached the first Advent sermon at the national cathedral in Copenhagen. Munk's body was found in a roadside ditch in rural Hørbylunde near Silkeborg the next morning with a note stating, "Swine, you worked for Germany just the same." Munk's body was returned to his parish church, Vedersø, where it is buried outside the choir. A simple stone cross was also erected on a small hill overlooking the site where Munk's body was dumped.

Half of the January 1944 issue of the resistance newspaper De frie Danske was dedicated to Munk with his portrait filling the front page. The obituary Danmarks store Søn—Kaj Munk (The great son of Denmark—Kaj Munk) filled the next page, followed by excerpts from a new year's sermon he had given. Next came a description of his murder and a photo reportage from his funeral. Lastly the paper featured condemning reactions from influential Scandinavians, namely Prince Wilhelm, Duke of Södermanland, Jarl Hemmer, Johannes Jørgensen, Sigrid Undset, Erling Eidem, and Harald Bohr. The Danish government allowed his widow, Lise, to live at the parish house until she died in 1998. The church and parish house were restored as a memorial and opened to the public in 2010.

== Playwright ==
Munk often used a historical background for his plays—among his influences were William Shakespeare, Adam Oehlenschläger, Henrik Ibsen, and George Bernard Shaw. As a playwright, Munk became known for "strong characters"—integrated people who fight wholeheartedly for their ideals (whether good or bad). In his play En Idealist, for example, the "hero" is King Herod whose fight to maintain power is the motive behind all of his acts until he is at last defeated by a show of kindness to the Christ child in a weak moment.

His 1925 play Ordet (The Word) is generally considered to be his best work; it is an investigation of miracles from the unique (at least, to theatre) viewpoint of one who was not prepared to dismiss them. A family of farmers—of differing degrees of faith—find themselves reconciled to their neighbours through a miracle. A 1943 film adaptation titled Ordet in Swedish (The Word in English) was directed by Gustaf Molander. A 1955 film version of Ordet was directed by Carl Theodor Dreyer, and won numerous awards, including the Golden Lion at the 16th Venice International Film Festival and the 1956 Golden Globe Award for Best Foreign Language Film. Munk's plays, many of which have been performed at the Royal Theatre, Copenhagen, and elsewhere, include:

- Pilatus (1917; published 1937)
- Ordet (tr. The Word) (1925)
- Kærlighed (1926)
- En Idealist (1928)
- I Brændingen (1929)
- Kardinalen og Kongen (1929)
- Cant (1931)
- De Udvalgte (1933)
- Sejren (1936)
- Han sidder ved Smeltediglen (1938)
- Egelykke (1940)
- Niels Ebbesen (1942)
- Før Cannae (1943)

His play Niels Ebbesen has been translated into English (2006) by his granddaughter Arense Lund and Canadian playwright Dave Carley.

== See also ==
- Clearing murder
- Schalburgtage
