= Bolbro Hill =

Hill in Denmark

Coordinates: 55°23′38.2″N 10°19′53.4″E

- Location within Denmark

Geography
- Location: Bolbro (Odense, Denmark)

Bolbro Hill is a hill in the western part of the Bolbro District in Odense, Denmark. It was the location of the famous Odinstårnet (Odin Tower) from 1935 to 1944.
