= Clearing murder =

A clearing murder (Danish: clearingmord, German: Ausgleichsmorde) was a revenge killing of a known and popular Dane in the last part of the Nazi German occupation of Denmark during World War II. When a German or Danish soldier or informant was killed by the Danish resistance movement, the Peter group performed one or more clearing murder. At some time in the latter half of 1944, Adolf Hitler ordered that 10 civilians be killed each time a German soldier was killed by civilians. In Denmark, this was modified so that only one civilian was shot for one German soldier.

The first clearing murder was of the famous author and priest Kaj Munk on 4 January 1944. Subsequently, several doctors were murdered, including a senior consultant in Vejle and four doctors in Odense. In all, it is estimated that around one hundred people were killed in clearing murders. Usually, the clearing murders were done as street shootings in order to increase the terror impact of fear and uncertainty in the general population. The aim was to turn the population against the Danish resistance movement. Doctors were especially vulnerable to clearing murders since they were out to look after the sick at any time of day. The Germans demanded that the Danish newspapers print articles linking resistance killings and clearing murders next to each other on the same page.

== See also ==
- Schalburgtage
