= Ordet =

1955 Danish supernatural drama film by Carl Theodor Dreyer

- theatrical release poster
- Directed by: Carl Theodor Dreyer
- Screenplay by: Carl Theodor Dreyer
- Based on: Ordet (1932 play) by Kaj Munk
- Produced by: Carl Theodor Dreyer
- Starring: Henrik Malberg; Preben Lerdorff Rye; Birgitte Federspiel; Ejner Federspiel; Emil Hass Christensen
- Cinematography: Henning Bendtsen
- Edited by: Edith Schlüssel
- Music by: Poul Schierbeck
- Production company: A/S Palladium
- Distributed by: Kaj Munk & Carl Theodor Dreyer A/S
- Release dates: 10 January 1955 (Denmark); September 1955 (Venice)
- Running time: 126 minutes
- Country: Denmark
- Language: Danish

Ordet (Danish pronunciation: [ˈoːˀɐɤ], meaning "The Word", originally released as The Word in English) is a 1955 Danish supernatural drama film, written, produced and directed by Carl Theodor Dreyer. It is based on a 1932 play by Kaj Munk, a Danish Lutheran priest.

The film won the Golden Lion at the 16th Venice International Film Festival, and was the only film by Dreyer to be both a critical and financial success. It is now regarded by many critics one of the greatest films of all time, admired particularly for its pristine cinematography. In Sight and Sound magazine's 2012 poll on the greatest films of all time, it placed 19th in the directors' poll and 24th in the critics' poll.

== Plot ==
The film centers on the Borgen family in rural Denmark during the autumn of 1925. The devout widower Morten, patriarch of the family, prominent member of the community, and patron of the local parish church, has three sons. Mikkel, the eldest, who has no faith, is happily married to the pious Inger, who is pregnant with their third child. Johannes, who was purportedly inspired by the Holy Spirit after studying Søren Kierkegaard, believes himself to be Jesus Christ and wanders the farm. He condemns the age's lack of faith, including that of his family and of the modern-minded new pastor of the village. The youngest son, Anders, is lovesick for Anne Petersen, the daughter of Peter, the leader of a local Inner Mission sect.

Anders confesses to Mikkel and Inger that he loves Anne. They agree to convince Morten to assent to the match. Later, Inger attempts to convince Morten to allow Anders to marry Anne. Morten angrily refuses, but changes his mind when he finds out Peter has refused Anders' proposal. Morten and Anders go to meet Peter to negotiate the betrothal.

After a mental breakdown, Johannes (Preben Lerdorff Rye) believes that he is Jesus Christ.

Morten tries to convince Peter to permit the marriage, but he continues to refuse unless Morten and Anders join the orthodox church. As the discussion collapses into sectarian bickering, Morten receives a call announcing that Inger has gone into a difficult labor. Peter says he hopes Inger will die, as maybe then Morten will see the error of his ways and join Peter's church. Furious at Peter's comments, Morten attacks Peter and storms out with Anders, the two of them rushing home. While the doctor cannot save the baby, he is able to save Inger. After the doctor and pastor leave, Johannes angers his father by telling him that death is nearby and will take Inger unless Morten has faith in him. Morten refuses to listen and, as prophesied, Inger dies suddenly.

While preparing to go to Inger's funeral, Peter realizes that he has wronged Morten terribly and reconciles with him over Inger's open coffin, agreeing to permit Anne and Anders to marry. Johannes suddenly interrupts the wake, approaches Inger's coffin, and proclaims that she can be raised from the dead if the family will only have faith and ask God to do so. Inger's daughter takes the hand of Johannes (again seemingly inspired by the Holy Spirit) and impatiently asks him to raise her mother from the dead. Johannes praises her childlike faith and asks God to raise Inger, who begins to breathe and twitch in her coffin. Seeing what seems to be the miracle of resurrection, Morten and Peter rejoice, forgetting their religious differences. As Inger sits up, Mikkel embraces her and proclaims that he has finally found faith.

== Cast ==
- Henrik Malberg as Morten Borgen
- Emil Hass Christensen as Mikkel Borgen
- Birgitte Federspiel as Inger Borgen, Mikkel's wife
- Preben Lerdorff Rye as Johannes Borgen
- Cay Kristiansen as Anders Borgen
- Ejner Federspiel as Peter Petersen
- Gerda Nielsen as Anne Petersen
- Sylvia Eckhausen as Kirstin Petersen
- Ove Rud as the Pastor
- Henry Skjær as the Doctor
- Edith Trane as Mette Maren (attender at Petersen's)
- Ann Elisabeth Rud as Maren Borgen, Mikkel's Daughter
- Susanne Rud as Lilleinger Borgen, Mikkel's Daughter
- Hanne Agesen as Karen, Borgen's servant

== Production ==
=== Pre-production ===
After several years of financial problems stalled his film career, Dreyer was awarded a lifelong lease to the Dagmar Bio, an art-house movie theater in Copenhagen, in 1952 . The Danish government had often given such awards to older artists, and the profits from the theater allowed Dreyer to begin production on a new film through Palladium Studios. Around that time, Palladium president Tage Nielsen received a suggestion for Dreyer's next film from the government-run Dansk Kulturfilm; Dreyer had worked with them before. Kaj Munk's play I Begyndelsen var Ordet (In the Beginning was the Word) was written in 1925 and premiered in Copenhagen in 1932. Dreyer had attended the play's premiere in 1932 and had been writing notes for a film adaptation since 1933.

Dansk Kulturfilm suggested that Dreyer finally make the film and be retroactively paid for his years of work on the script. Munk had himself finished a script for a film version, which he tried and failed to sell to the production company Nordisk Film. The Swedish film adaptation, The Word, directed by Gustaf Molander and starring Victor Sjöström, was released In 1943. It couldn't premiere in Denmark until after World War II. For legal reasons, the 1943 film forced Palladium to wait until 1954 to begin production on Dreyer's film. Dreyer made changes to the original play, such as adding the film's opening scene (which was inspired by a passage from Munk's published memoir), omitting Johannes's previous love affair as a contributor to his mental illness and cutting two-thirds of Munk's original dialogue. Although Munk had died in 1944, he was careful to stay true to Munk's intention and the play's message. He cut dialogue down to the bare essentials, resulting in a minimalist film.

=== Filming ===
"I believe that long takes represent the film of the future. You must be able to make a film in six, seven, eight shots...Short scenes, quick cuts in my view mark the silent film, but the smooth medium shot — with continual camera movement — belongs to the sound film. " — Carl Theodor Dreyer

Filming lasted for four months: two months on a studio set and two months in Vedersø, a village in West Jutland where Munk had served as a Lutheran priest. Ordet is best remembered for its cinematography. The film has a total of 114 individual shots, half of which occur in the first and last scenes of the film. Many shots lasted for up to seven minutes. Dreyer used mostly long takes and a slow moving camera, as his style had been gradually progressing towards for several years. He also paid close attention to every minute detail during filming and later said that he "made the film crew equip the kitchen with everything he considered right for a country kitchen. Then... he set about removing the objects. Finally, only ten to fifteen remained, but they were just what were wanted to create the right psychological illusion."

Dreyer's shooting method was to shoot one individual shot per day. In the mornings Dreyer would rehearse with the actors while simultaneously blocking their movement, set up lights and block the camera movement. Then at the very end of the day Dreyer would film the single shot, usually shooting between 2 and 3 takes. Dreyer chose not to pre-plan any shots and every decision was made the day of the shoot.

Cinematographer Henning Bendtsen said that "each image is composed like a painting in which the background and the lighting are carefully prepared." Whereas most filmmakers at that time would use one or two lights for a scene, Dreyer and Bendtsen often used up to 20. Electricians often had to turn lights on and off during the shooting without it being noticeable on film. Dreyer disliked light meters and preferred to deduce the correct exposure at each location by eye. Actress Birgitte Federspiel said that “Lighting was his great gift and he did it with expertise. He shaped light artistically like a sculptor or a painter would.”

Dreyer staged the actors around the lighting design on the set and not to accommodate their performances. Federspiel said that Dreyer never verbally told the actors when he was pleased with their performances and would simply smile when they were performing the way that he wanted them to. The blocking of the actor's movement was so precise and carefully planned out that many of them had to count out their steps while speaking their dialogue. Federspiel said that Dreyer personally picked out costumes for every actor and even went shopping for stockings with her. He also hired a linguistic specialist to make sure that all the actors spoke the same dialect as the characters that they played. Dreyer had some difficulty with the elderly actor Henrik Malberg being able to remember his dialogue for such long takes. Munk had written the original role of Morten Borgen specially for Malberg in 1925.

Twice in the film, as Morten and Anders drive to and from their meeting with Peter the Tailor, they pass the rough cross erected at the place where the body of Kaj Munk was found. Munk was assassinated in 1944 during the Nazi occupation of Denmark for openly preaching against collaboration with the Nazi regime.

Like her character, Federspiel was really pregnant during the film's production and went into labor towards the end of the shoot. She agreed to allow Dreyer to tape record her labor pains while she was giving birth and then later use the recording as a sound effect in the finished film. While waiting for Federspiel to return to the production after having the child Dreyer and Bendtsen planned out the final resurrection scene. They shot two different versions of the scene, a version from Munk's play which suggests the possibility of Inger just appearing to be dead and a version where the resurrection is a genuine miracle. Dreyer chose to use the second version in the final film.

== Release and reception ==
The film premiered on 10 January 1955 at Dagmar Teatret in Copenhagen. It was Dreyer's first film since The Passion of Joan of Arc to immediately receive critical praise and was especially popular in his native Denmark with both critics and audiences, as well as with critics in other countries. It also won the Golden Lion at the 16th Venice International Film Festival. Kingsley-International Pictures released the picture in the United States in 1957.

Critic Roger Ebert gave the film a 4/4. He wrote "For the ordinary filmgoer, and I include myself, Ordet is a difficult film to enter. But once you're inside, it is impossible to escape." Critic Tom Milne wrote that "the interior scenes are luminous with a sense of expansive affection arising from the rich, warmly observed detail of the relationship... Throughout the film Dreyer's emphasis is on the density of emotion allied to gesture which he first explored in Master of the House." Critic Robin Wood also praised the film, but wrote that "our sense of the interdependence of the characters and their actions is communicated visually... one cannot but admire the total essentials, a process that certainly imbues those essentials with expressive intensity. At the same time, I find it difficult not to react against the style as repressive and deadening." In 2023, Ryan Gibley of The Guardian listed Ordet as the greatest Golden Lion winner of all time. Dave Calhoun of Time Out wrote that "‘Powerful’ doesn't do justice" to the film and that it "reminds us how in the end we know little about the mysteries of life. Dreyer manages to say all this within the framework of a strange, wondrous and shocking work. Once seen, it’s unlikely to leave you." Peter Bradshaw of The Guardian gave the film five stars and called it "a gripping and eerie tragedy of the supernatural". On the review aggregator site Rotten Tomatoes, the film has an approval rating of 100% based on 27 reviews, with an average rating of 9.7/10.

The film is sometimes cited as Dreyer's greatest work, and frequently appears in lists of the greatest films of all time. The Village Voice ranked the film at number 16 in its Top 250 "Best Films of the Century" list in 1999, based on a poll of critics. In Sight and Sound's 2012 poll on the greatest films of all time, the film placed 19th in the directors' poll and 24th in the critics' poll. In the earlier 2002 version of the list the film ranked 45th in critic's poll. In 2018 the film ranked 65th on the BBC's list of the 100 greatest foreign-language films, as voted on by 209 film critics from 43 countries.

It has been released on DVD by The Criterion Collection with spine number 126 as part of a box set with the other Dreyer films Day of Wrath and Gertrud.

== Awards ==
Ordet was entered into the 16th Venice International Film Festival and won its highest prize, the Golden Lion. In 1956 the film was among films honored with the Golden Globe Award for Best Foreign Language Film, as well as the National Board of Review Award for Best Foreign Film in 1957. At the 1955 Bodil Awards it won for Best Actor (Emil Hass Christensen), Best Actress (Birgitte Federspiel), and tied for Best Danish film with Sven Methling's Der kom en dag. It is currently ranked as the third most spiritually significant film of all time by Arts and Faith online community.

The film was included by the Vatican in a list of important films compiled in 1995, under the category of "Religion".

== See also ==
- List of films with a 100% rating on Rotten Tomatoes, a review aggregator website
