= The Man and the Girl at the Underground Mansion =

Danish folktale

The Man and the Girl at the Underground Mansion (Danish: Karlen og pigen i den underjordiske herregård) is a Danish folktale collected by theologue Nikolaj Christensen in the 19th century, but published in the 20th century by Danish folklorist Laurits Bodker.

It is related to the cycle of the Animal as Bridegroom and distantly related to the Graeco-Roman myth of Cupid and Psyche, in that the heroine is forced to perform difficult tasks for a witch.

== Summary ==
A man and a girl work at a farm. The man gifts the girl a black ribbon, which is stolen by a fox. The man pursues the fox into a country mansion. The girl hangs some clothes on the hanger at the farm, which are snatched by the same fox. The girl chases after the animal and arrives at the same mansion. The girl becomes a servant and is made to unload a dung heap and to wash a black cloth white as part of her tasks.

A man offers to help her in exchange for romance. The girl declines, but he helps her via a magic wand. Next, the girl learns the man is set marry the farmer's daughter, and the girl is ordered to get jewels for the upcoming wedding. The man warns her that the jewel box belongs to a witch, and on the way there, she must fix a broken plank of a bridge, milk a cow, give water to a bull, shake a tree, enter the witch's house and accept the food she will offer (a milk bowl), but give it to the dog. The girl follows the instructions to the letter and gets the jewel box from the witch. The girl escapes, despite the witch commanding the dog, the cow, the bull, the tree and the bridge to stop her. At a safe distance, the girl opens the box and a bird flies out of it, which the man forces back into the box with his wand.

Lastly, the girl is set to hold a torch near the married couple. The girl holds the torch until it nearly burns her fingers, but the man puts the torch out and, in the dark, kills his bride and her mother. He marries the girl and they live in the mansion.

== Analysis ==
=== Tale type ===
The tale is classified in the international Aarne-Thompson-Uther Index as tale type AaTh 428, "The Wolf": the heroine works for a witch and is forced to perform impossible tasks (such as washing a black object white and vice versa), but she prevails with the aid of a wolf. One of the heroine's tasks is to go to another witch (the first witch's sister) and get from her a box with songs or a bridal dowry for the first witch. In some variants, the heroine is sent with a letter to a second witch, who is to get the letter and kill the heroine.

However, tale type AaTh 428 is considered by scholars as a fragmentary version of the tale of Cupid and Psyche, lacking the initial part about the animal husband and corresponding to the part of the witch's tasks. Accordingly, German folklorist Hans-Jörg Uther revised the international classification system and subsumed previous type AaTh 428, "The Wolf", under the new type ATU 425B, "Son of the Witch".

=== Motifs ===
==== The heroine's helper ====
According to Danish scholar Inger Margrethe Boberg, the heroine's helper in type 428 may be a young man cursed to be an animal in Northern Europe, while in variants from Southern Europe her helper is the witch's own son, who falls in love with the heroine. Similarly, according to Russian folklorist Lev Barag, in type 428, the heroine's helper may be a wolf (like in Russian or in Serbo-Croatian texts), a cat or a dog; the animal helper then turns into a human male that marries the heroine.

== Variants ==
The second revision of the folktale index, published in 1961 by Stith Thompson, located variants in Denmark, Sweden, Finland and among the Finnish-Swedish. Thompson and Swedish scholar Waldemar Liungman listed variants of the type in Italy, Spain, Portugal, Norway, Iceland and Russia. In another work, Liungman noted that type AaTh 428 appeared mainly in the coastal countries of Europe.

=== Denmark ===
==== The Bride of the Hound ====
In a Danish tale from Vedersø and published in magazine Skattegraveren with the title Hundebruden ("The Bride of the Hound"), a couple have a son named Jens Peter. After his mother dies, his father remarries, but Jens Peter's stepmother, a witch, turns him into a poodle hound. One day, a girl comes to work for the stepmother, and she orders her to milk four she-goats, then to winnow a pile of grains with a bottomless sieve, and finally to go to the witch's sister's house in a remote farm and ask for bread. The poodle hound helps the girl in all tasks, with the condition that the girl gives him three kisses and calls him "rosenmund" ("rosy-mouth"). They also throw the witch stepmother in an oven and kill her. At the end of the tale, the girl decapitates the dog, as per his request, and turns him back to Jens Peter.

==== Little Per and Little Maren ====
Danish scholars Axel Olrik and Inger Margrethe Boberg summarized a Danish tale collected by philologist Ida Falbe-Hansen from Funen, with the title Lille Per og lille Maren ("Little Per and Little Maren"). In this tale, the titular Per and Maren follow a ball to the lair of a hill-woman ("Bjergkonen", in the original), and work for her. Maren is forced to wash a piece of black wool white. Per helps her in this first task by commanding the wool to turn white. Maren gives the wool to the hill-woman, who orders the girl to wash it black again. Next, Maren is tasked with cleaning heaps of dung. Thirdly, she is ordered by the witch to go to Hell ("Helvede"), to the witch's sister's house (called "Helvedkonen", in the original) and fetch ballads for the witch's daughter's wedding. Per intercepts Maren before she travels to Hell, and advises her: Maren is to oil gate hinges, shake a pear tree, turn loaves of bread inside an oven, milk a cow and give ladles to servants and groats to chicken. While in Hell, she must not eat anything, get the ballads and escape. Maren follows his warnings and escapes out of Hell with a basket full of ballads, the hill-woman's sister commanding her servants to stop Maren, to no avail. On the road back, Maren peeps into the basket and the ballads fly out of it. Per appears and brings them back into the basket. Lastly, Maren is made to hold candles next to the witch's daughter and Per, but the boy asks the bride to trade places with Maren and hold them. The candles burn the witch's daughter. Per and Maren kill the witch, the lair becomes a castle and they live there.

==== The Girl and the Dog ====
In an archival tale titled The Girl and the Dog, the heroine, an orphan girl, finds work with a dwarf woman and is given three hard tasks: to milk ferocious goats and to carry water in a sieve. She cries at their difficulty, when a little dog appears to her and offers to help in exchange for a kiss. She kisses the dog, which helps her in both tasks. Next, the dwarf woman orders the girl to go to Hell to get a cake. The little dog warns her not to eat anything when she arrives in Hell, and gives her advice on how to proceed: she is to feed the chicken and the cats, place firewood in a fire, and use a hook to hang some scythes to keep them from falling. She reaches Hell and enters a witch's house, where she is offered some porridge to eat, but she does not eat it and hides the dish in her clothes. She gets the cake and escapes, and the witch orders the animals and objects on the way to stop her, to no avail. The girl is released from the dwarf woman's employment and goes on her way. She then meets the same dog who helped her, which asks the girl to cut off its head. The girl follows its request; a man appears before her. They marry.

=== Sweden ===
Waldemar Liungman named tale type 428 in Sweden as Det spelande skrinet eller uppdraget hos häxans syster, translated to German as Der musizierende Schrein oder Der Auftrag bei der Schwester der Hexe ("The Music-playing Wooden Box or the Orders from the Witch's Sister").

In a Finnish-Swedish tale collected by G. A. Åberg from Strömfors with the title Te trölla prinsn, a girl finds work with an old woman. The first task is to wash black wool white. The girl cries over the impossibility, until a wolf appears to her with a magic wand. With the wolf's help, the girl accomplishes the task. The old woman, then, orders her to wash the white wool back into black. As the third task, the old woman gives the girl a letter and orders her to deliver it to her sister, who lives across the lake. The wolf gives another magic wand to the girl to create a dry passageway across the lake, and bread, firewood and two breadspades. The girl walks to the old woman's sister and gives the bread to two oxen, throws the firewood in a bonfire and gives the breadspade to two women by a stove. The girl gives the letter to the old woman's sister, who invites her in to eat some sausages. The girl accepts the food, but hides it in her clothing to trick the old woman. At the end of the tale, the girl disenchants her wolf helper, who was a prince under a curse.

August Bondeson collected a Swedish tale titled Svarte Joder ("Black Joder"): a poor old man is starving on Christmas Eve, and loudly declares he wishes to trade his daughter Inga for a cake. Suddenly, the door opens and a person offers the man a cake, in exchange for Inga. So a deal is made, and the person takes Inga with him. The man lives with Inga, but only appears at night. Inga's father pays her a visit and asks her about her mysterious husband. After listening to his daughter's tale, the man suggests Inga takes a light to her bed at night to better see her husband. Inga takes a candle to her bed and spies on the man asleep beside her: he is a handsome man. A drop of wax falls on him and he wakes up, lamenting to Inga that a witch cursed him into another form unless he married her daughter, but now they must go to the witch's house. Inga takes service with the witch, who, before she leaves, orders the girl to wash black clothes white. However, as much as Inga tries to wash them, the clothes keep getting blacker. A man named Svarte Joder offers his help, if she calls him her friend. Inga declines his offers, but Svarte Joder helps her in the task. Next, the witch orders Inga to grind groats. Thirdly, the witch is preparing her daughter's wedding, and orders Inga to go to the witch's sister (also a sorceress) to get a box, and the girl must not look inside. Svarte Joder intercepts Inga and warns her not to eat anything in the sorceress's house. The girl goes there and is offered a calf's foot, which she hides in her clothing. Inga gets the box and leaves the house. On the road, Inga opens up the box and its contents fly over to a nearby treetop. Svarte Joder appears and places the contents back into the box. Lastly, the witch marries her daughter to Svarte Joder (back to human form), and forces Inga to hold torches in her hands for the whole night, hoping the torches will burn her. Svarte Joder approaches Inga and offers to release her from the task if she says she wants him to be her friend. Inga agrees and trades places with the witch's daughter, so that she, and not Inga, is burned by the torches. It happens so. The next morning, the witch goes to check on Svarte Joder, and, seeing that Inga is on the bed, and her daughter burned to ashes, explodes in anger.

In a Swedish tale collected by author Gustaf Ericsson from Södermanland with the title Flickornas olika marknadsgåfvor ("The Girls' Gifts from the Market"), a farmer has to go to the market to buy fresh produce, and asks his three daughters what he can bring them. The elder daughter asks for a book, the middle one for a pair og gloves, but the youngest does not know yet. She then asks for "sorrow and worries". In the market, the farmer cannot find the gift for his youngest daughter, but he is instructed to tell the girl to go to the forest on the first Thursday, and she will find what she is looking for. The third sister follows the instructions and meets a dog in the woods. She grabs its tail and is taken to a mountaintop. The dog then tells the girl to climb down the mountain and find work in the king's farm. Before she goes to the king's farm, however, she meets an old woman of malicious character, who hires her as her servant. The next day, the old woman orders her to the stable to clean the cow dung. The girl tries to finish her task, but, the more dung she removes, the more appears, making it impossible to finish. The same dog appears to her and tells her to fetch a golden spade from the roof. With the new tool, she performs the task. Next, the old woman gives her a sandwich for her to eat, on penalty of death, but, the more the girl eats the sandwich, the more the sandwich is intact. The dog appears again and eats the sandwich for her. Third, the old woman sends the girl to her sister to fetch a bridal dress for her daughter, and she has to go beyond a mountain. Lost at what to do, the girl cries, until the dog appears to help her and advises her how to proceed: she will see two men fetching water, to whom she is to give buckets; then she will pass by two woodcutters who are to be given axes; then by two bakers (who are to be given breadspades), and two people carding wool with their bare hands (who are to be given cards to help them). After this sequence, the girl is to use two pillows to soften her passage between two gates, throw two pieces of bread to two dogs, enter the old woman's house and avoid sitting on a cushion (since a snake is hidden underneath it) and eating any food there. The girl follows the dog's instructions to the letter and meets the witch, who forces her to eat a sausage and meatloaf. The girl hides the food in her clothes to dupe the witch, takes the bridal dress and flees from the witch, who commands her servants to stop her, but the animals and people refuse to do so. Finally, the girl keeps the bridal dress for herself, and returns to her parents' house.

=== Iceland ===
Icelandic scholar Einar Ólafur Sveinsson located an Icelandic tale published by author Jon Árnáson, which he related to Cupid and Psyche, but supposed it was a combination of fragments of different stories. In this tale, titled Búkolla and translated as Bukolla, a man has three daughters, Sigridur, Signý and Helga. They lose their favourite cow Bukolla, and go to look for it in the mountains. None of them finds it, save Helga, who meets a troll witch, for whom she is forced to perform difficult tasks. The girl is helped by an ugly person called Dordingull, and the last task is for her to go to the Queen of the Dales (a character that Sveinsson considered to be a local and demythified Persephone). The vile ogress sends Helga to the Queen of the Dales or Dale-queen (Icelandic: Daladrottning) to get a brooch she left there and a game of chess. For the first task, Dordingull takes Helga to a little house where he commands a pickaxe and a spade to produce the brooch for her. For the next task, the man advises her to sit at the Dale-queen's table, make the sign of the cross to bless the tableware and eat not of the food the Queen offers, but to hide some portions in her clothes, and, when she is leaving, she must throw a morsel to the Dale-queen's wolves. After returning from the Dale-queen's with the game of chess, the witch orders Helga to make the bed, cook her hood and empty the slops - all in one night. When Helga tries to make the bed, the bed-clothes are firmly stuck and cannot be moved. Dordingull helps her, in exchange for a kiss, but she denies him. Lastly, Dordingull tells Helga she will have to find the witch's life-egg and break it against his head. She waits after the witch is asleep, fetches the life-egg and destroys it against Dordingull's head: the witch and the Dale-queen die, and Dordingull turns into a human prince. The tale was also republished as Búkolla og stelpan ("Bukolla and the girl").

=== Finland ===
In Pirkko-Liisa Rausmaa's study on the Finnish tale corpus, in type AT 428, Tyttö ja susi ("Girl and Wolf"), the witch sends the heroine to her sister with a letter with a command to kill the heroine, but she is saved by a wolf who is disenchanted to a human prince. Finnish folklorist Antti Aarne listed 6 variants of type 428 in Finland, five of them in manuscript versions. In a 1988 publication, Rausmaa indicated 11 variants of type AT 428 in the country.

Finnish scholar Pirkko-Liisa Rausmaa published a Finnish tale collected from Pori that he classified as type 428, Tyttö ja susi ("Girl and Wolf"). In this tale, titled Noidan kasvattitytär or Noita ja hänen kasvattityttärensä ("The Witch and her Adopted Daughter"), a witch lives alone in the forest, and one day finds a girl. She gives the girl a bundle of black wool and orders her to wash it white, otherwise the witch will kill her. The girl goes to the seashore and cries over the impossibility of the task, when a wolf appears to her. The wolf gives her a wand she uses to fulfill the witch's task. Next, the witch orders the girl to wash it black again, which she does with the help of the wolf: the animal gives her a wand and she magically turns the wool back to black. The witch then sends the girl to another witch, named Tiina, who lives on the other side of the lake, with a letter to be delivered to her. Before she crosses the bridge, the wolf intercepts her, gives her a wand and teaches her a magic command to open the waters to allow passage to Tiina's house. The wolf then instructs the girl to give bread to a horse, throw some firewood to fuel a fire, and give a rag to a person at an oven, before the reaches the witch's house. At Tiina's house, she is offered a sausage ('makkara'), which she tries to hide away to trick the witch: she hides it under the chair and under her clothes, until the girl finally hides it in her clothes, near her belly. The girl then escapes from Tiina's house, and the witch commands a person at an oven, the fire and the horse to stop her, to no avail. She then commands the sausage to kill the girl, but she throws it away and opens a passage with the wand. After the girl crosses it, Tiina tries to follow her, but sinks in the lake. The wolf then approaches the girl and takes her to his castle, instead of the witch's house, where they live together: he leaves by morning and returns at night, while she stays inside. One night, she strikes a match to better see her companion and finds the wolf. The animal wakes up and becomes human, then reveals he is a king's son cursed into wolf form by the witches. The king's son, now human, and the girl marry in a grand ceremony.

=== Latvia ===
According to the Latvian Folktale Catalogue, a similar story is found in Latvia, indexed as its own Latvian type *438, Suns — līgavainis ("The Dog Bridegroom"), but in its second redaction: a dog appears to the heroine and helps her wash black wool into white; later, when the heroine is tasked with going to another witch, the dog advises her not to eat any food while at the witch's house.

In a Latvian tale collected in Jaun-Laicene and published in 1891 with the title Vilkačos ("Werewolf"), a man fashions louseskin shoes for his daughter and sets a test: whoever guesses the material the shoes are made of, they shall marry his beautiful daughter. Many guess and fail. A werewolf ('vilkacis') comes to the man's house and guesses it right. The man has to part with his daughter as part of the deal, and she goes with the werewolf to his house. Once there, the girl is forced on hard tasks by her cruel mother-in-law: first, she is to bring water to the farm in a sieve. She cannot do it and cries, when the werewolf appears to her and suggests she plasters some flour on the sieve to fulfill the task. The next day, the mother-in-law orders the girl to feed their poultry (turkey, chickens and geese). Again, the werewolf advises her to use the sieve to spread grains for the birds. In return, the mother-in-law gives her some bread with sausage. The werewolf shouts at her to eat only the bread, not the sausage. The girl heeds his words and tosses the sausage to the corner, but her mother-in-law asks where the food is and it answers. She gives the sausage to the girl again, but this time she hides it in her clothes to trick the woman. The woman then scolds the poultry and the gates for failing to hurt her. The following day, the woman orders the girl to prepare a bed over a lake. The girl says it is impossible, but the werewolf teaches her how to do it. The woman appears to her and orders the girl to lie on it, but the girl feigns ignorance and bids her mother-in-law show her. The woman climbs onto the bed, and the werewolf pushes the bed deeper into the lake, where it sinks. At the end of the tale, the werewolf prepares a large pyre and asks his wife to throw his clothes into the fire. The girl does as asked and the werewolf rushes into the flames, coming out of them a human. The farm then becomes a large house, and he explains the witch cursed him into that state.

=== Italy ===
Italian author Vittorio Imbriani collected a tale from Florence with the title Le Due Belle-Gioje, which was translated by author Marc Monnier as Les Deux Mignon-Bijou. In this tale, a queen consults with an astrologer, who warns that her unborn child, the princess, will be taken by the wind. Fearing the prediction, as soon as the princess is born, she is placed and raised in a tower. One day, when she is old enough, the king, has father, consults with his ministers the next step to protect her, and they suggest he builds an iron carriage for her. Despite every measure of protection, while the princess is in her carriage, a strong gust of wind blows her away to an island where a fairy woman lives. She introduces herself as a princess, and the fairy, in a mocking tone, dismisses any notions of royalty, and tells the girl she has to earn her bread by working for her. At ten o'clock in the evening, the fairy gives the princess a meagre meal, while explaining the situation to her son, also named Bella-Gioja, just as the princess. The fairy's son visits the princess and tells her he would never mock her name, and advises her that his mother will force her to do things she will never be able to fulfill, so, at 11 o'clock in the evening, he will come and do it for her. This happens for the next two nights. On the third night, Bella-Gioja and the fairy's son escape with a magic ring from his mother. Back home, the fairy, noticing his son's tardiness, goes to check on him and sees his empty bedroom, then goes after the pair. She passes by a garden-keeper selling his vegetables, then a tailor selling fabric, and a priest and a church, and none of them know of the pair. Soon after, Bella-Gioja and the fairy's son realize the fairy is on their trail, and Bella-Gioja uses the magic ring to create behind them a forest, then a mountain, and finally a field of pointy needles that destroy the fairy. At last, the princess and the fairy's son reach her homeland, where they create a palace with the magic ring. The next day, the king sees the newly built palace and goes there with two pages to meet the lord of the castle. The fairy's son appears to him and introduces himself as Bella-Gioja, also the name of the king's daughter. Princess Bella-Gioja is beside her beloved, the fairy's son, and tells her father the fairy forced her on difficult tasks: on the first day, she had to separate a heap of green beans, white beans and corn; on the second day, she had to gather all the clothes, mend, sew, wash, dry and iron them - both tasks done with the fairy's son help. The king is happy for his daughter's safe return and marries her to the fairy's son. Swedish scholar Jan-Öjvind Swahn considered the tale as a variant of type 428.

In an Italian tale from Bagnacavallo, Emilia Romagna, with the Romagnol title La fôla del surgatì, (Note: Surgatìn meaning 'little mouse' in Romagnol.) translated to Italian as La favola dei topini ("The Story of the Little Mice"), a widower has a daughter named Lucia, and he remarries. The girl's stepmother is wicked and forces Lucia to do all chores around the house. One day, she orders Lucia to bake bread for when she returns. The girl sits on the steps of the house and begins to cry, when a little mouse appears to comfort her, offerings its help: the mouse whistles and many mice appear to gather the ingredients and prepare the bread for Lucia's stepmother. When the woman returns home, she notices the bread is baking, but sees a trail of crumbs going outside the house, and deduces Lucia had help, so she beats her. The following day, she orders Lucia to clean and sweep the house from the attic to the basement, and leaves. Lucia calls on the little mouse, which summons his companions to help remove the cobwebs. The girl repays the mice with a little flour. Her stepmother comes in and, noticing the trail of flour on the ground, scolds Lucia and locks her up in the cellar (cantina, in the Italian text). Lucia cries for her situation, when the mouse appears to comfort her. Lucia explains her stepmother saw the trail of flour and locked her there, so the little animal calls on his companions to gnaw away at the door to release Lucia. The door becomes so thin it crumbles under Lucia's foot when she kicks it down, and the girl accompanies the mice to the patio. The mouse places his paw on the wall and a descending stairwell appears before Lucia, who goes down it. Down there, she finds a magnificent palace and the mouse sits on a throne, then says that a wizard turned them into mice, until a beautiful maiden kissed him. Lucia goes in to kiss the little mouse, and suddenly all the mice become a prince and his army. The now human prince asks Lucia to come to his kingdom, but the girl misses her father. The prince goes to bring him and reveals to the man his wife's true character. The man agrees to join them in the prince's kingdom, and lives with Lucia, who marries the prince. As for the stepmother, she cries alone in her house. The tale was originally collected in 1977, and, according to Stefano Orioli, the tale probably derives from a literary treatment. Renato Aprile, editor of the Italian Catalogue of the Tales of Magic, classified as a combination of types ATU 444* and ATU 425B.

=== Switzerland ===
In a Swiss tale translated to French as Le Roi-Souris ("The Mouse King"), a young girl named Lucetina lives in the village of Tessin with her father and stepmother. When her father is away on a journey, the stepmother begins to mistreat the girl and gives her only bread to eat. One day, the woman tells Lucetina she will hold a party and needs a lot of bread, so she forces Lucetine to knead fifty kilos of flour into dough by night. Lucetina cries for the impossibility of the task, when a little mouse, named Roi-Souris (Mouse-King), appears to help her: the mouse whistles and an army of rats appear to knead and prepare the dough, and by night eighty buns are ready to be baked. Lucetina repays the mouse's service with some dough. The following morning, the stepmother wakes Lucetina before sunrise and orders her to bring firewood home to bake the bread. Lucetina goes to the woods and cannot find any firewood, then cries, when Roi-Souris appears to help her: he summons his army of mice to comb the forest for any branches and roots, which they bring to Lucetina's home. The girl bakes the bread and her stepmother arrives home, smelling the scent of baked bread. On the third day, the stepmother orders Lucetina to clean and sweep the entire house, from the attic to the basement, and leave no trace of dust or of cobwebs. Lucetina starts her task, but the house is too big and she cannot finish it in a single day. Roi-Souris appears to help her and summons his army of mice to help her clean up the entire house. Lucetina repays the mice's help with some bread. On the fourth day, her stepmother beats her up, calls her names, and locks her up in a cell in the basement, so that no one can help the girl. Lucetina begs her stepmother to let her go, but it falls on deaf ears. She cries for her situation, when Roi-Souris appears to release her: he summons his mouse army to gnaw at the door, so the girl can tumble the door. Lucetina escapes and follows the mice to a little cave, where she finds a literal army of mice with swords and their king, Roi-Souris, sat on an ornate throne. Lucetina thanks Roi-Souris for his help and kisses him. This causes Roi-Souris and the mice to turn into humans, and Roi-Souris explains he was a king cursed into rodent form by an evil witch. Roi-Souris and Lucetina marry and invite her parents. Lucetina's father is welcomed to the wedding, but they burn the stepmother so she can hurt anyone any longer. The tale was collected by Pia Todorovitch from an informant named Jolanda Bianchi-Poli, from Brusino-Arsizio, in 1982, and classified as type AaTh 428, "Le loup", of the French Folktale Catalogue, by Delarue and Thénêze. (Note: French scholars Paul Delarue and Marie-Louise Thèneze, establishers of the French folktale catalogue, follow Jan-Öjvind Swahn's classification: French type 425A (or sous-type A) follows Cupid and Psyche with the tasks, and they include tale type 428, "Le loup", under subtype 425A. In the international index, however, Swahn's typing A is indexed as type ATU 425B, "The Son of the Witch".)

== See also ==
- The Tale about Baba-Yaga (Russian fairy tale)
- The Little Girl Sold with the Pears
- La Fada Morgana (Catalan folk tale)
- Prunella (fairy tale)
