= Odense Stadium =

Association football stadium in Denmark

Odense Stadium Nature Energy Park
- Naming rights agreement since June 2018

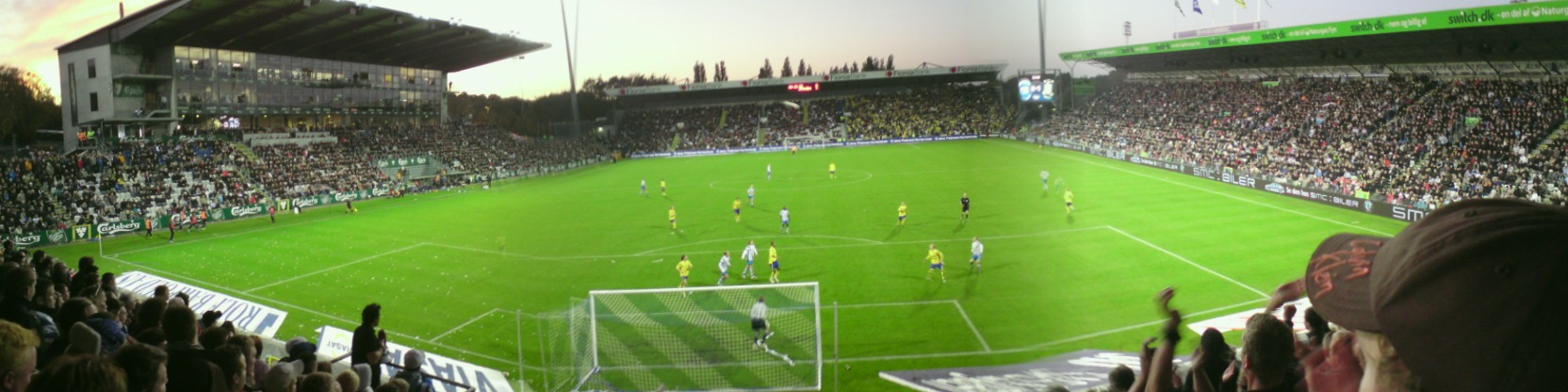
- Panorama view of the stadium during a match in 2008
- Interactive map of Odense Stadium; Nature Energy Park
- Full name: Nature Energy Park
- Former names: Odense Stadion (1941–present); Fionia Park (2005–2010); TRE-FOR Park (2010–2016); EWII Park (2016–2018); Nature Energy Park (2018–present)
- Location: Højstrupvej 7B; DK-5200 Odense V
- Coordinates: 55°23′52″N 10°21′00″E
- Owner: Odense Municipality; Odense Sport & Event
- Capacity: 15,790 (13,990 seats)
- Surface: Natural grass
- Record attendance: 30,924 (B1913 vs Esbjerg fB, 1 September 1963)
- Field size: 105 by 68 metres (114.8 yd × 74.4 yd)

Construction
- Groundbreaking: 1937
- Built: 1939–1941
- Opened: 17 August 1941; 85 years ago
- Renovated: 1965, 1996–1997, 2004–2005
- Cost: DKK ~1 million (1937–1941); DKK 60 million (1996–1997); DKK 50 million (2004–2005)
- Architects: Edvard Thomsen & Vagn O. Kyed(1939–1941), Gert Andersson (1996–1997), Søren Vestergaard of TKT A/S (2004–2005)

Tenants
- Odense Boldklub (1947–present); Odense Boldklub Q (2021–present); FC Fyn (2011–2012); Boldklubben 1909 (some matches); Boldklubben 1913 (some matches); 1990–91 Danish Cup Finals; 7x Danish Women's Cup Finals; Denmark A (some matches); Denmark women's A (some matches); FBUs Pokalturnering Finals (some matches)

Odense Stadium (Danish: Odense Stadion) is an association football stadium in the Bolbro district of Odense, Denmark. Nicknamed Folkets Teater (lit. 'The People's Theater') by Jack Johnson, it has been the home ground of Odense Boldklub since the 1940s and since 2021 for Odense Boldklub Q. The stadium has previously hosted select matches for FC Fyn (2011–2012), Boldklubben 1909, and Boldklubben 1913.

With a current capacity of 15,790 (13,990 seatings; 13,573 seatings for international matches), it is the fifth largest football stadium of any football team in Denmark. It is part of the sports complex, known as Odense Sports Park (Danish: Odense Idrætspark), owned by Odense Municipality and run by the company of Odense Idrætspark (a department of "By- og Kulturforvaltningen, Fritid og biblioteker" under the municipality).

The venue was inaugurated in August 1941 as Odense Stadium with major renovations made in the 1990s and 2000s. In recent years, it has been known under several names due to sponsorship arrangements; Fionia Park (2005–2010), TRE-FOR Park (2010–2016), EWII Park (2016–2018), and in June 2018 it was renamed Nature Energy Park, when the naming rights for Odense Boldklub's football matches and events was acquired by Nature Energy, an energy company. In FIFA and UEFA matches, it is known under its original name, Odense Stadium, due to sponsorship restrictions.

The 1990–91 Danish Cup Finals were played at the stadium, which has also hosted 7 Danish Women's Cup Finals (1997/98–2002/03 and 2013/14) and several home matches for both the Denmark national football team (since 1962) and the Denmark women's national football team (since 1984). Other uses have included hosting concerts with a capacity of 22,000 concertgoers, Fagenes Fest in 1948 and the DGI's Landsstævnet in 1985.

== History and development ==
=== Background and inauguration ===
External images
- View from the top of a pole showing the spectators entering the inauguration football match on 7 September 1941.
- Color image from the top of a pole showing the inauguration association football match on 7 September 1941 between a select Odense team and Boldklubben Frem.
- Situation picture from the grandstand of the inauguration match action on 7 September 1941 between the two teams.
- View of the crowd at the stadium's only grandstand during the inauguration football match on 7 September 1941.
- Color image from the top of a pole showing the spectators leaving the stadium after the inauguration association football match.

Compared with other major Danish cities, it took a long time before a stadium was constructed in the city of Odense. The sports facilities in Odense after World War I have been described as being overall bad even though sports facilities exited in Kræmmermarken and Odense Boldklub had its own sports facility. In the beginning of the 1920s, Aarhus and Aalborg inaugurated their own stadiums, which increased the local discussions regarding building a stadium in Odense, but a decision could not made in the first couple of years, partly due to the huge concerns by the dominating political party in the city council, Conservative People's Party. The stadium plans were finally approved by the then-mayor of Odense, Hans Christian Petersen (Conservative People's Party), and Odense Idrætspark was founded on 27 December 1927, with the expectation that the municipality built the stadium, and the local sports clubs would run it. The building site for the city's first stadium was placed at Kildemosen, in an area located in the western section of the workshops for Sydfyenske Railways (SFJ) and 'Sukkerkogeriet Odense'. On 16 August 1931, the first edition of Odense Idrætspark, was inaugurated with an association football match marked by pouring rain – on the exhibition pitch without any grandstands – between a selected Odense-team and the runners-up in the 1930–31 Austrian football championship, SK Admira Vienna, with the visitors securing a 9–2 win.

At the beginning, the construction of the site went according to schedule, with a football field and fences being ready, but the sports clubs only managed to finish constructing half of the remaining part of the sports facility and the municipality refused to give any assistance. Due to the hard economic situation in the 1930s, the funding of the plans for improving the stadium's austere conditions could not be found. The stadium eventually never turned out to be the sports facility, it was intended to be for the local sports community, and in 1936, the administration of the stadium declared bankruptcy. Due to the lack of maintenance, the football pitch went into so much oblivion, that the Odense clubs decided they would rather play tournament matches on their own facilities. A memorial stone with no inscription, raised during the construction of the old stadium area, today marks the site, which has since been loaned out to KFUM's Boldklub Odense and Boldklubben Frem.

The bankruptcy quickly triggered a new discussion about the construction of a new and much more comptemporary sports facility located at an alternative site, with either Kræmmerparken, Fruens Bøge, Bolbro or Kildemosevej being suggested by the politicians. At the beginning of 1937, a vote by the politicians at Odense City Hall decided, that the new location of the second edition of Odense Idrætspark and a contemporary stadium was to be placed at Bolbro, further west of the city center than the location of the old stadium. The vote took place only a few months before the next city council elections, where the Conservative People's Party and the Social Democrats fought fiercely for the power of the city council.

The construction of the site broke ground in the spring of 1937 and was intended as a relief work for the unemployed, which meant that the contractor could not use major excavators – the work had to be done by hand. The original design of the stadium was made by the Danish architect professor Edvard Thomsen (1884–1980) in cooperation with architect Vagn O. Kyed (1903–19??), and built in the period 1939–1941 with Odense Municipality as the developer. The original stadium design consisted of only one grandstand with a capacity of approximately 1,000 covered seats, while the rest of the stadium were standing areas, consisting of terraces on each side of the grandstand (southwest side), a long terrace on the opposite northeast side, a high terrace behind the goal in the southeast side, while there was no terrace behind the goal in the northwest side, that was on level with the playing field. In connection with stadium, a stadium tower, a stadium clock and a kiosk were located at the south entrance, which was the only official entrance in the fenced area, and with flagpoles placed in the south sections of the stadium. The construction cost of the entire sports facility, comprising five fields (an association football stadium with a total capacity of approximately 12,000 spectators, an athletics stadium, a cricket ground, a hockey pitch and a throwing lane), was DKK 1,314,266.26 kr. (1941), which corresponded to the yearly wage of approximately 350 unskilled workers, and was entirely funded by the municipality of Odense.

The second edition of Odense Idrætspark was officially inaugurated on 17 August 1941, when the Danish athletics championships were organized at the athletics stadium and speeches were held in the presence of the mayor of Odense, Ignatius Vilhelm Werner (Social Democrats), the chairman of National Olympic Committee and Sports Confederation of Denmark, Holten Castenschiold, 7,000 spectators and transmitted to the radio by Gunnar "Nu" Hansen. The first association football match at the stadium was an exhibition game played three weeks later, on 7 September 1941, a team representing the city of Odense – featuring select players from the three highest ranking local clubs of the 1940–41 season, Boldklubben 1913, Boldklubben 1909 and Odense Boldklub playing in white shirts and black shorts/socks – meet the reigning Danish champions, Boldklubben Frem, playing in white shorts and blue/red shirts and socks. Before the match, the mayor of Odense gave an inauguration speech, and the national anthem Der er et yndigt land was sung, following by giving up the ball to officially start the game, that ended with the Copenhagen team winning the match 6–2 after a quick initial 1–0 lead from the home team. The first goal was scored by left winger Edvard Thorsen from Boldklubben 1913, representing the selected Odense team, against the then-national team goalkeeper, Egon Sørensen.

=== Expansions and conversion to all-seater ===
Only minor changes was made to the original buildings at Odense Stadium between 1941 and the fall of 1996. The first significant change to the buildings were made in 1965 with the establishment of a lighting installation with a light intensity of 400 lux and a minor renovation to the grandstand. In the first couple of decades after the inauguration, there was a recurrent need to expand the capacity of the stadium to accommodate the increasing number of spectators to the football matches for Boldklubben 1909, Boldklubben 1913 and Odense Boldklub. During the 1950s and 1960s the three clubs played interchangeably in the highest and second highest Danish football leagues, drawing large crowds to the Odense derbies between each other, with all three clubs playing in the 1960 and 1968 Danish 1st Division respectively at the same time. During the summer break in 1959, an expansion of north-east stand was made to hold an additional 1,360 standing spectators, which was done by adding 17 new steps each 80 meters in length. The north-east stand would later become a covered stand with no seatings.

In the 1990s, a decision was made by Odense Municipality to do an extensive renovation of the entire stadium at a total construction cost of DKK 60 million. The renovations, made in the years 1996–1997, consisted of expanding the stadium with four new seating grandstands that included a small number of standing areas in the corners. The last couple of renovations were not finished until 1998. It was considered among the most modern stadiums in Denmark after the renovation in the 1990s.

In 2004, under-soil heating was installed on the football field together with other minor improvements, financed by Odense Municipality through the sale of condos and building-rights to Odense Boldklub A/S, at a construction cost of DKK 10 million. The following year, reconstruction of the VIP-facilities/sponsor lounge including expansion of the main grandstand were made by Odense Boldklub A/S, so that Odense stadium would be in full compliance with the requirements of UEFA to host international matches. The VIP building was designed by the Danish architect Søren Vestergaard, one of the then two main shareholders of Torkild Kristensens Tegnestue A/S (TKT) and the investment of DKK 40 million was done by Odense Boldklub A/S. Unlike the rest of the stadium, which is owned by Odense Municipality and run by Odense Idrætspark (a department of "By- og Kulturforvaltningen, Fritid og biblioteker" at the municipality), the VIP building was originally owned by Odense Boldklub A/S (OB), but the ownership was transferred to Odense Sport & Event A/S (OSE), when the limited company merged with Odense Congress Center A/S (OCC) on 1 May 2006, almost a year after the renovations was made. The yearly rental agreement by OCC, for the use of the stadium, gives the club the rights to use the stadium for 20 matches at a cost of DKK 2.1 million (2013) up from DKK 1,7 million in 2007, while more matches cost an additional DKK 101,000 per match, and includes the sale of advertisements, catering, stadium naming rights and priority access to their own matches being held on the stadium.

== Records ==
The stadium's record attendance was recorded on 1 September 1963, when reportally 30,924 spectators watched the 1963 Danish 1st Division match between the 1962 season's runners-up Boldklubben 1913 and the reigning Danish champions Esbjerg fB. The game was won 3–2 by Esbjerg fB during which the youngest spectators had to be placed closest to the sidelines of the football field to make room for everybody. With Odense Boldklub as the home team, the local derby match against Boldklubben 1909 in the 1973 Danish 2nd Division drew 26,877 spectators, which became the record attendance number for an Odense Boldklub home match, while also becoming a record for a match in the second highest level in Denmark – the game ended in a tie, 2–2. By finishing top of the league in the first half of the 1961 Danish 1st Division, Boldklubben 1913 qualified to play in the 1961–62 European Cup, where the second round home match against Real Madrid on 18 October 1961 drew 27,584 spectators, which remains the largest crowd present at an international club match on Odense Stadium. Approximately 40,000 spectators were present at the opening ceremony of DGI's Landsstævnet on 27 June 1985, the highest number in the history of Denmark's largest sports festival. The record attendance after the stadium's total renovation in 1997 is 15,486 spectators, which was recorded during the 2008–09 Danish Superliga season, when the home team Odense Boldklub played against FC Copenhagen on 13 May 2009, winning the match 3–2.

== Name, sponsorships and logos ==
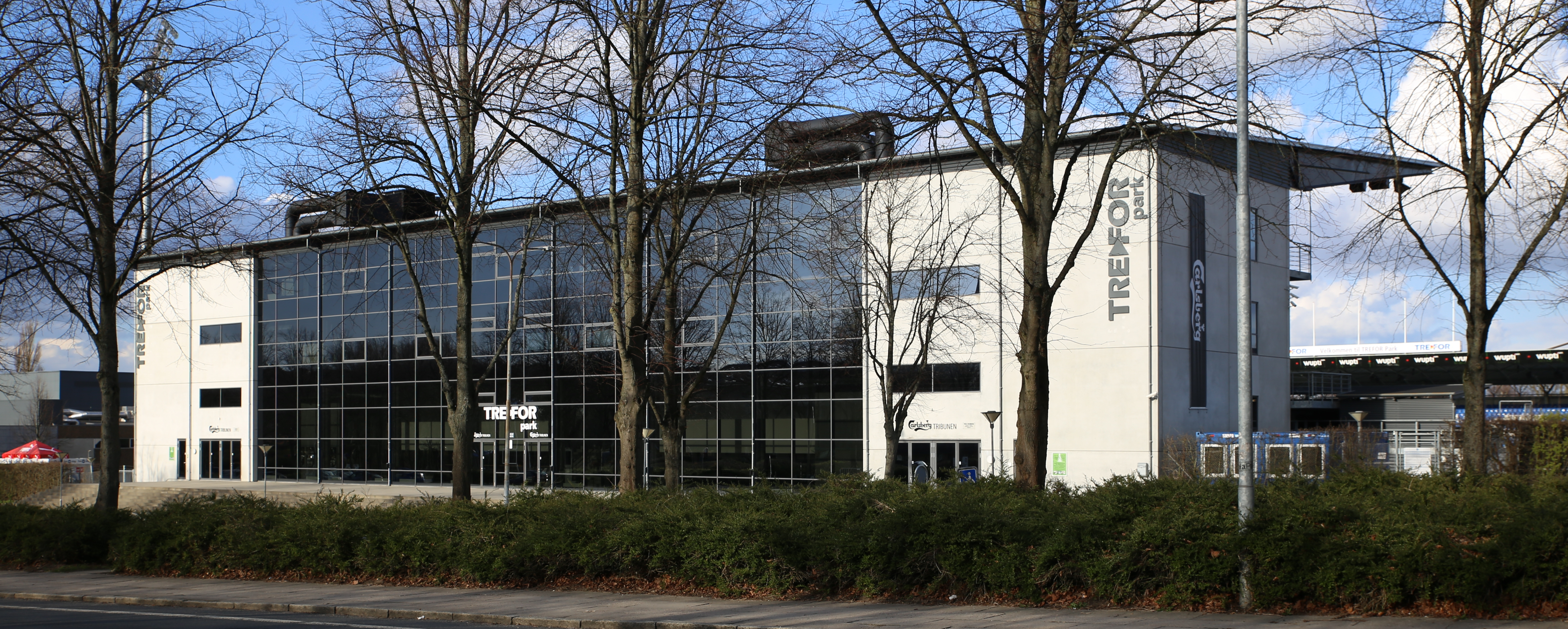
The VIP building (the Carlsberg stand) at the stadium shown here in 2014 during the TRE-FOR Park era, where the sponsored stadium logo was installed on the facade.

The late Danish footballer and manager, Jack Johnson, referred to the stadium as Folkets Teater (en: "The People's Theater"), which is a nickname that has stuck with the stadium throughout the years. Being the largest stadium located in the largest city on the isle of Funen, Odense Stadium is unofficially referred to as Fyns national-stadion (en: "the national stadium of Funen").

As part of the rental agreement with Odense Idrætspark of the home ground, Odense Boldklub (through Odense Sport & Event A/S) has the possibility to sell the naming rights of the stadium. The stadium changed its official name to Fionia Park (1 July 2005 – 20 June 2010), when the naming rights were bought by the regional bank Fionia Bank A/S for a five-year period becoming only the second large stadium in Denmark to change its name by selling its naming rights to a sponsor. Afterwards TRE-FOR Park (1 July 2010 – 22 October 2016) became the official name for the stadium, when the energy group TRE-FOR acquired the naming rights for the stadium as part of a five-year sponsorship deal, which was extended in February 2015 for an additional three years. Four years later a new name, EWII Park, was officially introduced on 23 October 2016 on the day that the Superliga match between Odense Boldklub and FC København was played, because the stadium sponsor decided to change its own company name to EWII. On 7 June 2018, the stadium's current name was introduced as Nature Energy Park, when the energy company, Nature Energy, became the stadium sponsor.

The rental agreement does not force other teams or events, such as the Denmark national football team or Boldklubben 1909, that rent the stadium for a single event or match, to use the sponsor name used by Odense Boldklub for their matches. The sponsor name for the stadium cannot be used when hosting FIFA and UEFA events, since these governing bodies have policies forbidding corporate sponsorship from companies that are not official tournament partners. In UEFA national team and club matches, it is known under its original name Odense Stadium.

Logos used for the naming rights agreements of Odense Stadium:

Fionia Park
(2005–2010)
Sponsor: Fionia Bank

TRE-FOR Park
(2010–2016)
Sponsor: TRE-FOR

EWII Park
(2016–2018)
Sponsor: EWII

Nature Energy Park
(2018–present)
Sponsor: Nature Energy

== Structure and facilities ==
The stadium consists of four stands (north, east, south and west):

- Two long-side stands:
  - The Carlsberg stand (2342 seats)
  - The Barfoed Group stand (4764 seats)
- Two end stands:
  - The Richard Møller Nielsen stand (before known as "Stiften") home supporters stand (3496 seats (at league games the capacity is improved because of a standing-section))
  - The 3F stand (3295 seats) (away stand)

In addition to this there are 1800 standing places (1000 home team – 800 away team), 24 places for the disabled and 45 press seats. The Richard Møller Nielsen stand belongs to the fans of the home team.

The VIP facilities are located in the Carlberg stand, and covers a total of 600m^{2} and the dining can handle up to 1.000 individuals. Besides meetings rooms, the six sky boxes have the latest AV-equipment installed and have room for 10 persons each, while there are also 5 lounges inside the VIP-building.

== Concert venue and other uses ==
The stadium can hold 22,000 concertgoers. Two concerts have been held at the venue:

- Elton John (24 June 2007) during the Captain and the Kid Tour
- Roger Waters (13 May 2008) during the Dark Side of the Moon Live tour

Other uses have included hosting Fagenes Fest in 1948 and the DGI's Landsstævnet in 1985.
