= Peter group =

Danish paramilitary group

The Peter group (Danish: Petergruppen) was a paramilitary group created in late 1943 during the occupation of Denmark by the German occupying power. The group conducted counter-sabotage, also known as Schalburgtage, in response to the Danish resistance movement sabotage actions. The group was named after its German instigator Otto Schwerdt aka Peter Schäfer.

Later it also became known as the Brøndum gang in reference to one of its members, Henning Brøndum, decisive role in numerous actions.

It made a point of using captured or diverted resistance weapons in its operations: there are several documented cases where individuals were killed with the Welrod "silent pistol" - an SOE assassination weapon air dropped to the Resistance but recovered by the Gestapo and then supplied to the Peter Group. The Museum of the Danish Resistance has this to say of the Peter Group: "In an effort to fight and suppress the resistance activity, SS Standartenfürer Otto Anton Rolf Skorzeny on behalf of Heinrich Himmler created a "Sonderkommando Dänemark" which[sic] sole purpose was to kill famous or otherwise well-known or productive Danish citizens, and perform terror by blowing up amusement parks, cinemas, trains, trams and other public friendly places. It was also decided that for every German killed in Denmark, 5 Danish citizens were to be killed in retaliation."

The group is infamous for the murder of Kaj Munk on January 4, 1944 and the destruction of the lookout tower Odinstårnet in Odense on December 14, 1944.

Seven members, including Henning Brøndum and Kai Henning Bothildsen Nielsen, of the group were sentenced to death in April 1947 and executed in May 1947.

== See also ==
- Lorenzen Group
