= Kai Henning Bothildsen Nielsen =

Danish Nazi collaborator

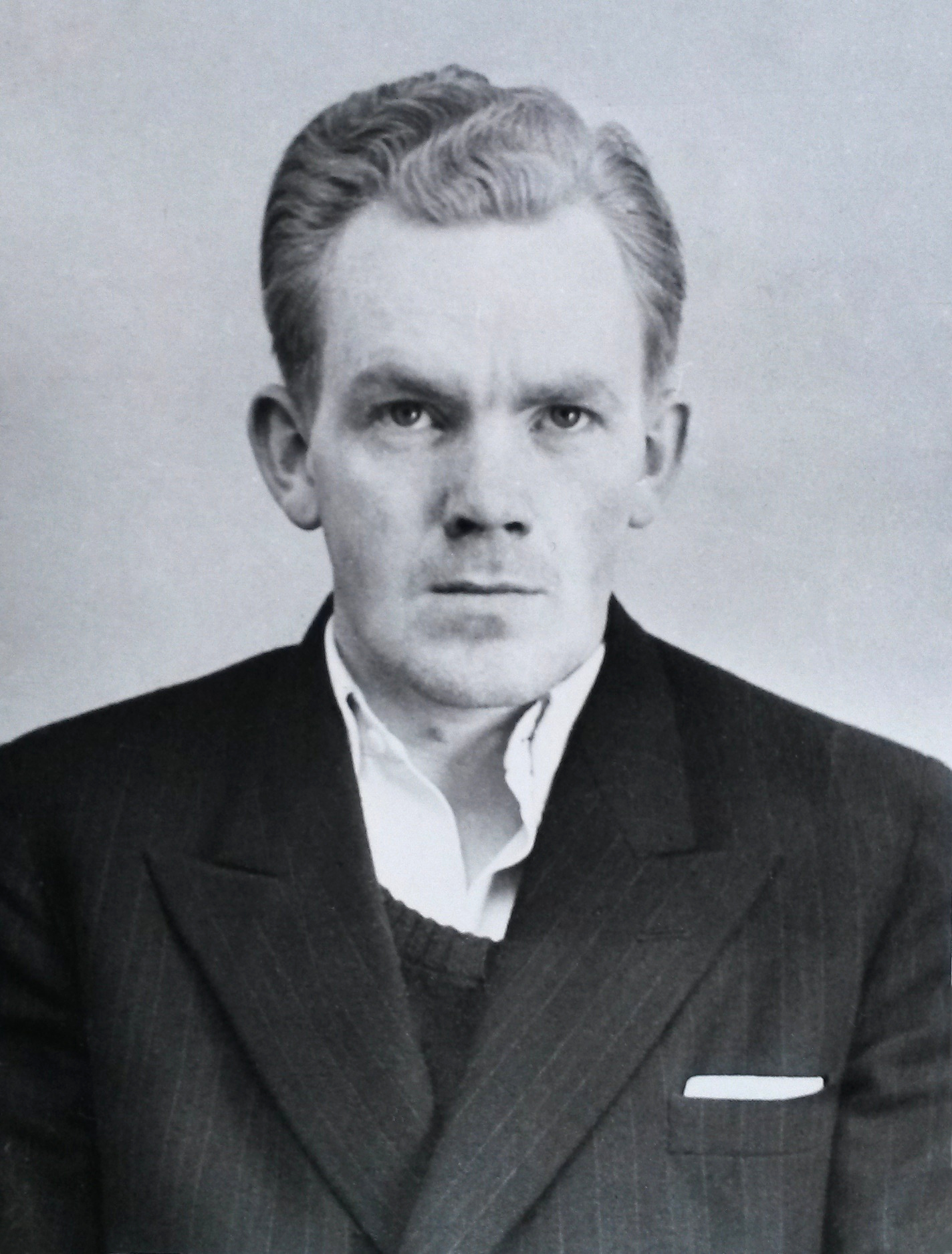
- Kai Henning Bothildsen Nielsen
- Born: 4 December 1919; Aarhus, Denmark
- Died: 9 May 1947 (aged 27); Copenhagen, Denmark
- Cause of death: Execution by firing squad

Kai Henning Bothildsen Nielsen (4 December 1919 – 9 May 1947) was a Danish national socialist who became a member of the Peter group in Denmark during the Second World War. He participated in numerous operations to murder and bomb civilians and public servants as collective punishment whenever the Danish resistance carried out an operation. Bothildsen was after the war convicted for 57 murders, 9 attempted murders and 116 sabotage events and given a death sentence which was eventually ratified by the Danish Supreme Court. He was executed on 9 May 1947 in Copenhagen.

== Biography ==
Bothildsen Nielsen was the son of coach driver Marius Bothildsen Nielsen and his wife Kirsten Marie Christoffersen. They lived in Absalonsgade 45 in Aarhus when their son was baptized. Bothildsen Nielsen grew up in a stable if modest household. He completed elementary school with good grades and marks but his later school years proved more difficult and when he was 16 years old, he dropped out.

In 1938 Bothildsen joined the Danish National Socialist Workers' Party of Denmark and their Sturmabteilung. In 1940 he applied to join the Waffen SS but was rejected for medical reasons. In January 1941 he tried again and was sent to an SS-academy in Sennheim, Germany. In March 1941 he was discharged for medical reasons. He opted to stay in Germany where he opened a paint shop which he ran until June 1943 when he was enrolled in Schalburgkorpset. In Schalburgkorpset he was assigned the Intelligence wing which had a special status as an autonomous unit increasingly used by the Germans to carry out various jobs. Bothildsen Nielsen worked for the Intelligence-units until April 1944 when he joined the Peter Group.

In the Peter Group Bothildsen Nielsen quickly became one of the leaders. He was assigned the codename Perle (English: Pearl) and under that name he participated in a large number of actions aimed at punishing civilians. He participated in murders, bombings of buildings and trains and destruction of landmarks. When German forces in Denmark surrendered Bothildsen Nielsen attempted to go underground but on 12 May 1945 he was arrested by the police after a suicide attempt. Bothildsen Nielsen was sentenced for 57 murders, nine attempted murders, 116 sabotage-events, five train bombings and 3 robberies. On 14 April 1947 he was sentenced to death by shooting along with 6 others. The sentence was executed at 03:15 on 9 May 1947 on Bådsmandsstræde Barracks in Copenhagen.
