= Odinstårnet =

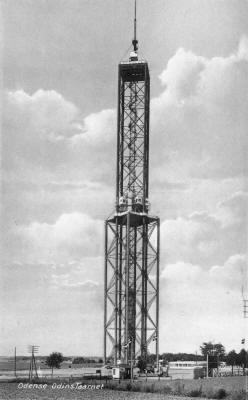
- The Odin Tower

- Location within Denmark

General information
- Status: Destroyed
- Type: Observation tower
- Location: Bolbro Hill, Odense
- Coordinates: 55°23′38.2″N 10°19′53.4″E
- Completed: 1935
- Destroyed: 14 December 1944

Height
- Height: 175 m (574.15 ft)

Odinstårnet (The Odin Tower) was an observation tower located on Bolbro Bakke (Bolbro Hill) in Odense, Denmark.

== History ==
The tower, 175 metres (581 ft) tall, was built in 1934-1935 using spare materials from the construction of the first Little Belt Bridge and opened on 29 May 1935. The tower quickly became a symbol and source of pride of both Odense and the entire island of Funen. Visitors said they could see the entire island from its observation platforms. If this statement is true, it was possible to see more than 50 kilometres (31 mi) away.

Construction of the tower took 30 tons of steel, 2,700 tons of concrete, and half a million kroner, a considerable amount of money at the time. The tower had two platforms. The first, located 70 metres (230 ft) above ground, was a restaurant featuring a great star-shaped room with low, broad windows, a buffet, and seats for 160 guests. Its roof was decorated with a great compass card with a map of Odense in the centre, surrounded by directions to all towns on the island. Each town was indicated by its direction, name, and coat of arms.

A second platform was located 140 metres (460 ft) above ground, with an even greater view. From here, a spiral staircase offered access to the Conch Bar (Danish: Konkyliebaren), the name inspired by the staircase. Tables were located with one on each step of the staircase.

The tower's kitchen was suspended beneath the restaurant on the first platform and considered to be very modern. The tower was a popular tourist attraction and in 1935 alone, it attracted more than 213,000 visitors, including many foreigners. It was also a favourite playground for model airplane enthusiasts.

The Odin Tower was blown up on 06:15 AM on 14 December 1944 by a group of Danish Nazi saboteurs called the Peter group under the leadership of Henning E. Brøndum, in a so-called act of Schalburgtage. The tower collapsed completely and was damaged beyond repair. It took two months to remove the scrap metal and almost ten years to remove the concrete.

On 29 May 2004, the 69th anniversary of the inauguration of the original tower, students of the Odense Technical College (Odense Tekniske Gymnasium) erected a 12-metre-tall (39 ft) replica of the destroyed tower on its original site.

== Gallery ==
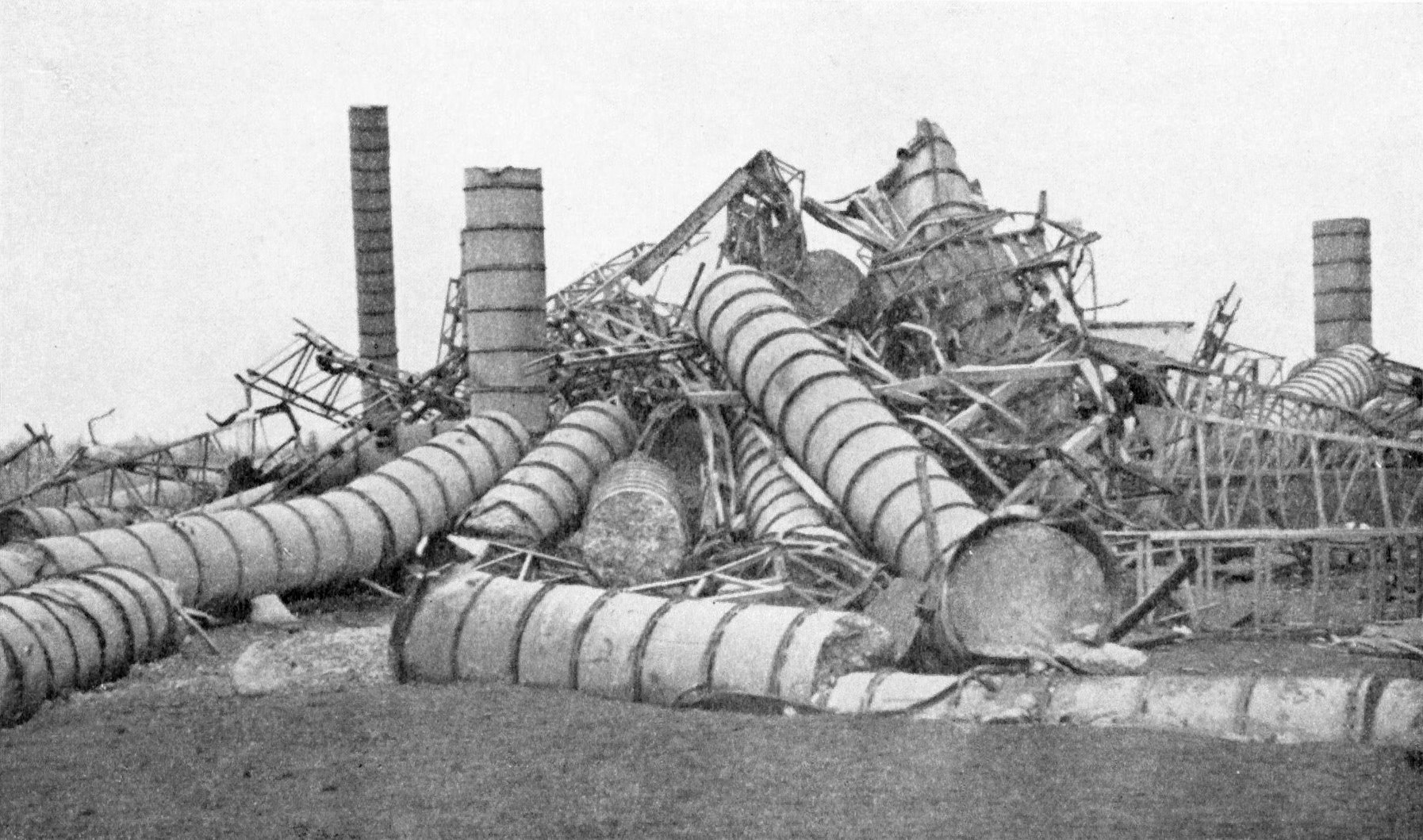
Ruins of the destroyed tower.

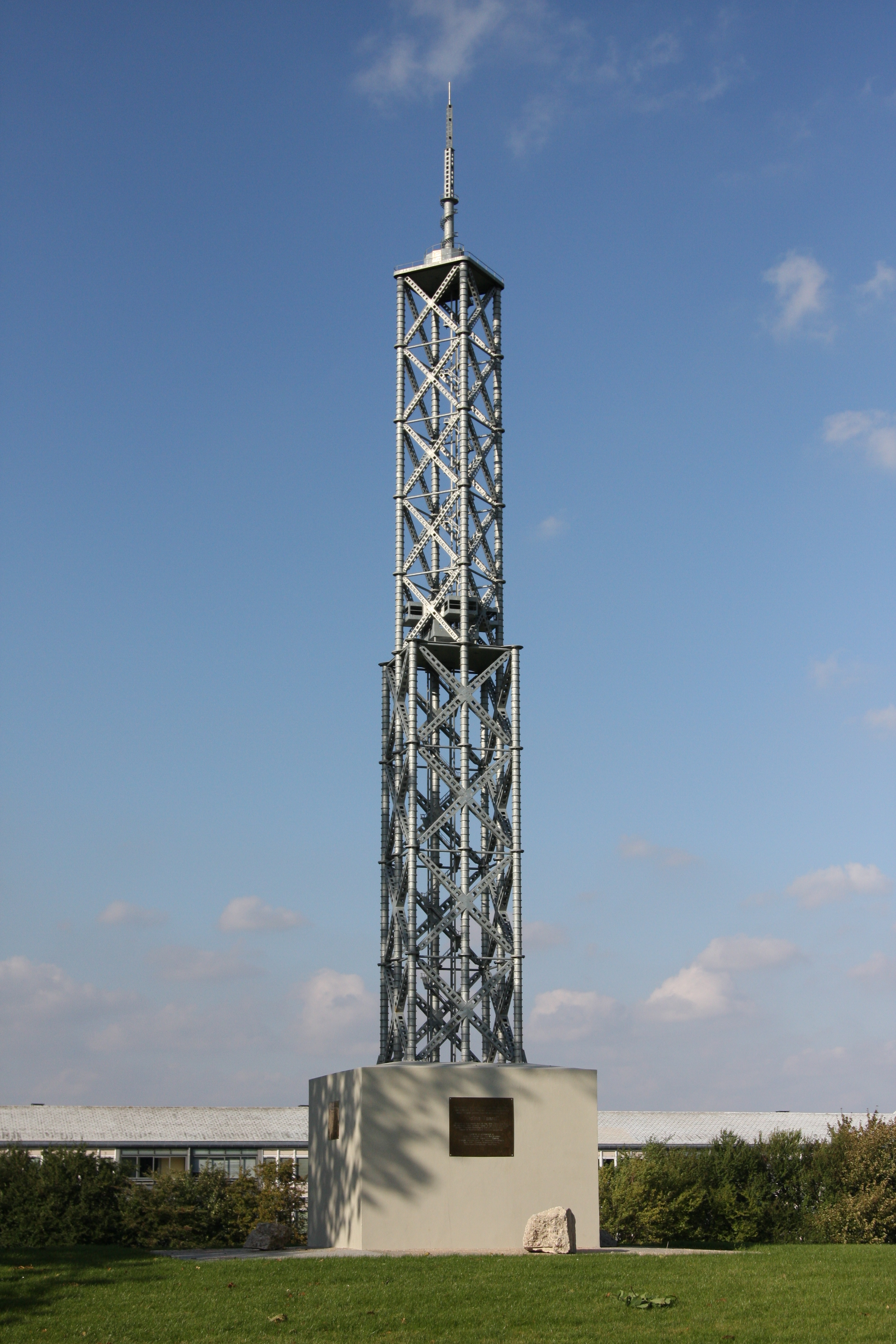
Replica of the tower at its former site. Erected in 2004.
