= Bolbro =

- Neighbourhood
- Location in the Region of Southern Denmark
- Coordinates: 55°23′42″N 10°20′34″E
- Country: Denmark
- Region: Southern Denmark
- Municipality: Odense Municipality
- Time zone: UTC+1 (CET)
  - Summer (DST): UTC+2 (CEST)

Bolbro is a Western neighbourhood of Odense, Funen, Denmark. It contains many sports stadiums and clubs including the Odense Idrætspark, Odense Isstadion, Odense Stadium, and Bolbroparken. Bolbro has the zip code 5200, which in many years were associated with the zip code, where the average inhabitants have the lowest income, as a large part is on social welfare. Although being poor, this suburban area has a very strong community, where people living here refer to each other as "BolBrothers" or "BolSisters". Bolbro is also often referred to as; BolBronx, Five-Two-double o or Five-two-diamond-diamond.

Bolbro also used to have the highest tower in northern Europe, before World War II, where "Odinstårnet" (The Tower of Odin) was destroyed - a small replica can be found on Jellingevej. Most roads in Bolbro are named after old Nordic Gods and kings.
