= De Wervelwind =

De Wervelwind (Eng: The Tornado) was a journal published in London and dropped by the Royal Air Force over the Netherlands during the Second World War. The final edition was larger and was handed out after the liberation of the Netherlands.

The first edition appeared on 1 April 1942 and it was produced monthly until December 1944. The final edition described how it was established on the initiative of the British. It was produced by a Council of editorial staff and a smaller work committee. The work committee was chaired by the English history professor, George Norman Clark. Also involved were Adriaan Pelt, a Dutch journalist, A. den Doolaard, journalist and writer, Professor Matthijs Bokhorst, a representative of the British government and later also a representative of the American Office of War Information. Members of the Dutch government in exile also took part in the Council of editorial staff.

== Gallery ==
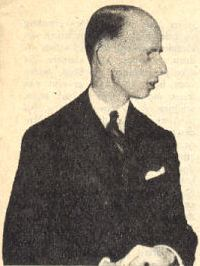
Eelco van Kleffens in issue 14 (September 1943)

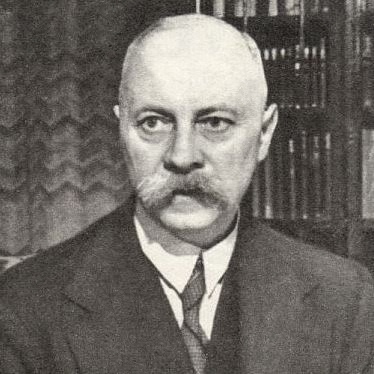
Pieter Sjoerds Gerbrandy, Prime Minister of the Dutch government in exile, in issue 3 (June 1942)

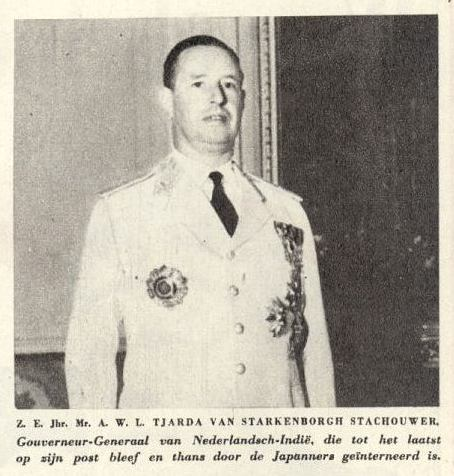
Tjarda van Starkenborgh Stachouwer in issue 2 (May 1942)
