= 16th Venice International Film Festival =

Italian film festival in 1955

- Official festival poster by Giorgio Zucchiatti
- Location: Venice, Italy
- Founded: 1932
- Awards: Golden Lion: Ordet
- Festival date: 25 August – 10 September 1955
- Website: www.labiennale.org/en/cinema/

Venice Film Festival chronology
- 17th 15th

The 16th Venice International Film Festival was held from 25 August to 10 September 1955.

Italian film critic Mario Gromo was appointed as the president of the jury. The Golden Lion was awarded to Ordet, directed by Carl Theodor Dreyer.

== Jury ==
=== Main Competition (Venezia 16) ===
- Mario Gromo, Italian journalist and film critic - Jury President
- Antonín Martin Brousil, Czechoslovak film critic and historian
- Piero Gadda Conti, Italian novelist and film critic
- Jacques Doniol-Valcroze, French actor, film director and critic
- Arthur Knight, American film critic and historian
- Emilio Lonero, Italian journalist and film critic
- Roger Manvell, British film historian
- Domenico Meccoli, Italian journalist, film critic and screenwriter
- Carlo Ludovico Ragghianti, Italian art critic and historian

== Official Sections ==
The following films were selected to be screened:

=== In Competition ===
English title	Original title	Director(s)	Production country
Abandoned	Gli sbandati	Francesco Maselli	Italy
After the Storm	Después de la tormenta	Roberto Gavaldón	Mexico
The Big Knife		Robert Aldrich	United States
Boris Godunov	Борис Годунов	Vera Stroyeva	Soviet Union
Ciske the Rat	Ciske de Rat	Wolfgang Staudte	West Germany, Netherlands
The Deep Blue Sea		Anatole Litvak	United Kingdom
The Devil's General	Des Teufels General	Helmut Käutner	West Germany
Doctor at Sea		Ralph Thomas	United Kingdom
8 × 8: A Chess Sonata in 8 Movements		Hans Richter	United States
El canto del gallo		Rafael Gil	Spain
Friends for Life	Amici per la pelle	Franco Rossi	Italy, France, Spain
From My Life	Z mého života	Václav Krška	Czechoslovakia
The Grasshopper	Попрыгунья	Samson Samsonov	Soviet Union
Il bidone		Federico Fellini	Italy, France
Interrupted Melody		Curtis Bernhardt	United States
Jhanak Jhanak Payal Baaje	झनक झनक पायल बाजे	V. Shantaram	India
John and Julie		William Fairchild	United Kingdom
The Kentuckian		Burt Lancaster	United States
La Tierra del Fuego se apaga		Emilio Fernández	Argentina, Mexico
Le Amiche		Michelangelo Antonioni	Italy
Les héros sont fatigués		Yves Ciampi	France, West Germany
Les mauvaises rencontres		Alexandre Astruc	France
The Little Rebels	Chiens perdus sans collier	Jean Delannoy	France, Italy
Mãos Sangrentas		Carlos Hugo Christensen	Brazil, Argentina
The Mask and Destiny	修禅寺物語	Noboru Nakamura	Japan
Men of the Blue Cross	Błękitny krzyż	Andrzej Munk	Poland
Moment of Decision	Trenutki odločitve	František Čáp	Yugoslavia
The Naked Dawn		Edgar G. Ulmer	United States
Ordet		Carl Theodor Dreyer	Denmark
Pride	Orgullo	Manuel Mur Oti	Spain
Princess Yang Kwei Fei	楊貴妃	Kenji Mizoguchi	Japan, Hong Kong
Seagulls Die in the Harbour	Meeuwen sterven in de haven	Rik Kuypers, Ivo Michiels, Roland Verhavert	Belgium
To a New Shore	К новому берегу	Leonid Lukov	Soviet Union
To Catch a Thief		Alfred Hitchcock	United States
Troubled Road, a Man Decides	Неспокоен път	Dako Dakovski	Bulgaria

=== Out of Competition ===
English title	Original title	Director(s)	Production country
The Girl and the Oak	Djevojka i hrast	Krešo Golik	Yugoslavia
The Grand Maneuver	Les Grandes Manœuvres	René Clair	France
Il padrone sono me		Franco Brusati	Italy

== Official Awards ==
The following official awards were presented at the 15th edition:

=== Main Competition ===
- Golden Lion: Ordet by Carl Theodor Dreyer
- Silver Lion:
  - The Grasshopper by Samson Samsonov
  - The Big Knife by Robert Aldrich
  - Le Amiche by Michelangelo Antonioni
  - Ciske the Rat by Wolfgang Staudte
- Volpi Cup for Best Actor:
  - Kenneth More for The Deep Blue Sea
  - Curd Jürgens for Les héros sont fatigués
