= Schalburgtage =

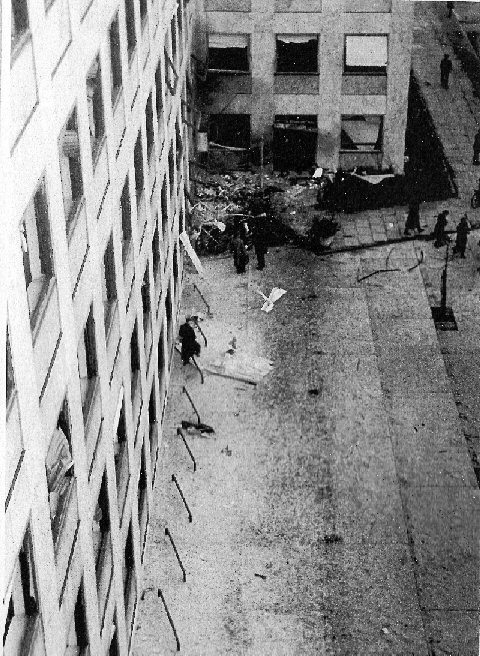
Aarhus City Hall bombing, 1945

Schalburgtage was the popular name for the retaliation which Germans and their Danish collaborators carried out as revenge for resistance activity in the last part of the occupation of Denmark between 1944 and 1945. The term is partially a reference to sabotage and partially to the Schalburg Corps who carried out most of the actions.

The occupying power called it counter-sabotage, but the Danes quickly adopted the name schalburgtage. In fact, most of the schalburgtage was carried out by the Peter group, most of whose members were also members of the Schalburg Corps. Schalburgtage was directed against both the Danish resistance movement and Danish society in general. This introduced killings of esteemed Danes which occurred when a German soldier or a Danish informant was killed. These killings were called clearing murders.

== See also ==
- Schalburg Corps
