= Vedersø =

- Village
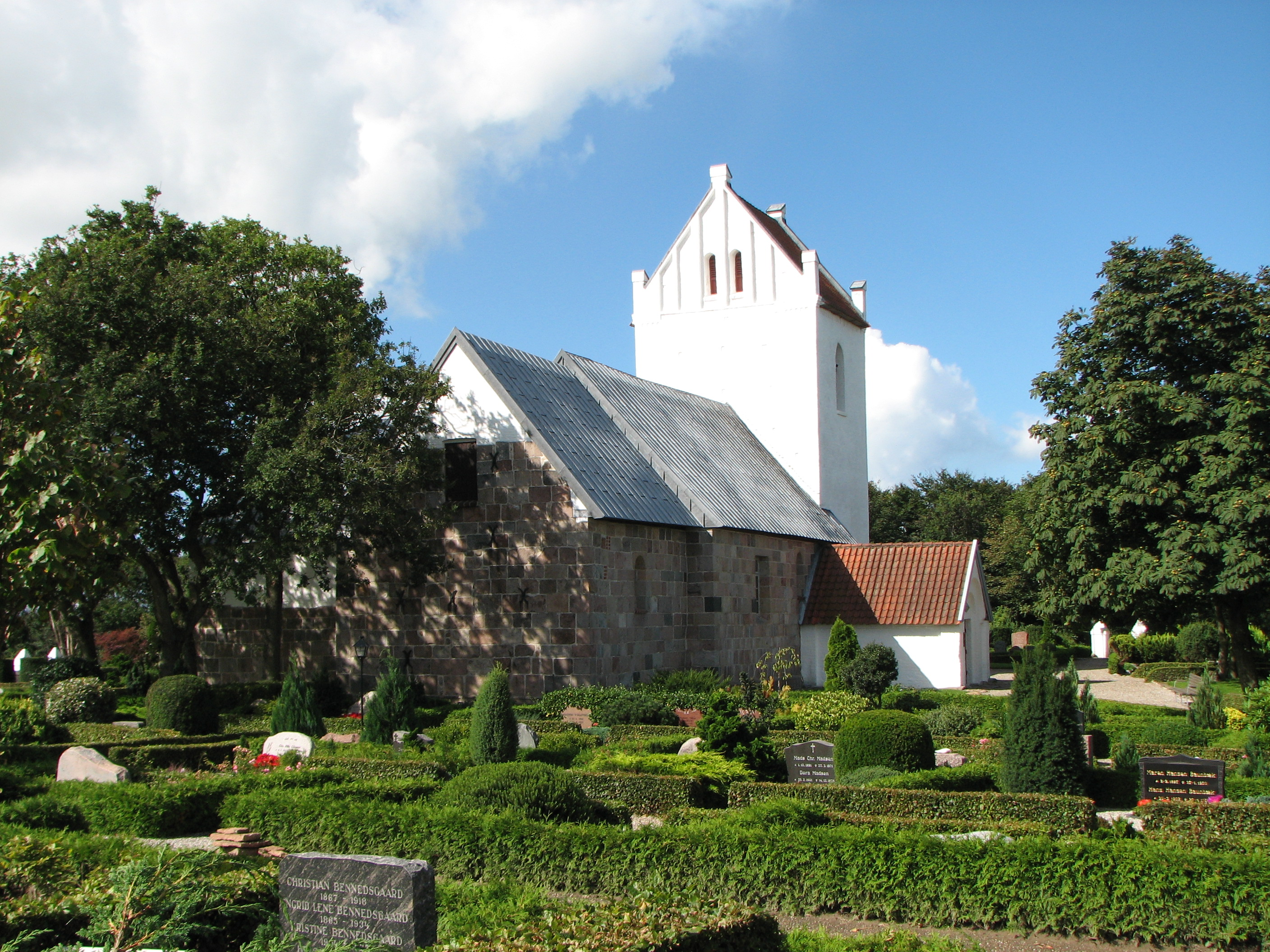
- Vedersø Church

- Location in Central Denmark Vedersø (Denmark)
- Coordinates: 56.23475°N 8.19931°E
- country: Denmark
- Region: Central Denmark (Midtjylland)
- Municipality: Ringkøbing-Skjern

Population (2026)
  - Total: 201

Vedersø is a small village, with a population of only 201 (1 January 2026), in Ringkøbing-Skjern Municipality, Central Denmark Region in Denmark. It is situated between Ringkøbing Fjord and Nissum Fjord in Western Jutland.

Vedersø Church, from around the year 1150, is located in the village.

The poet and priest Kaj Munk was priest in Vedersø from 1924, until he was arrested and assassinated by Gestapo in 1944.

The village is also the location of Vedersø Efterskole "The International Academy and Boarding School of Denmark". It is the only 100% English speaking efterskole in Denmark and a part of the self-governing institution Vedersø Idrætsefterskole (Sports College).
