= Circus Building, Copenhagen =

Building in Copenhagen, Denmark

The Circus Building
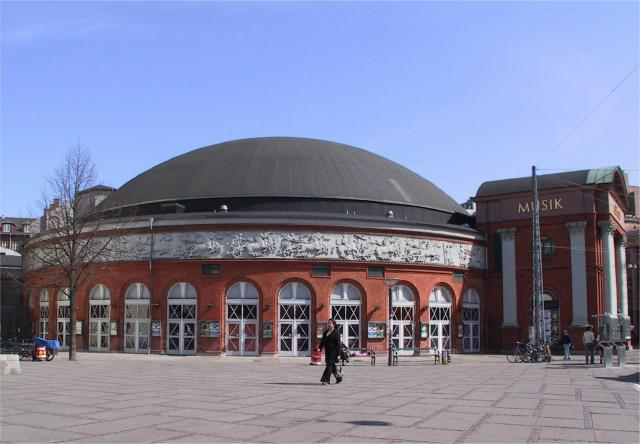
- The Circus Building

General information
- Architectural style: Historicism
- Location: Copenhagen, Denmark
- Coordinates: 55.6761°N 12.5650°E
- Construction started: 1885
- Completed: 1886

Design and construction
- Architect: Henrik Vilhelm Brinkopff

The Circus Building (Danish: Cirkusbygningen) on Axeltorv in Copenhagen, Denmark, is a circular building completed in 1886 to serve as a venue for circus performances. The last circus to use the building was in 1990.

== History ==
=== Construction phase ===
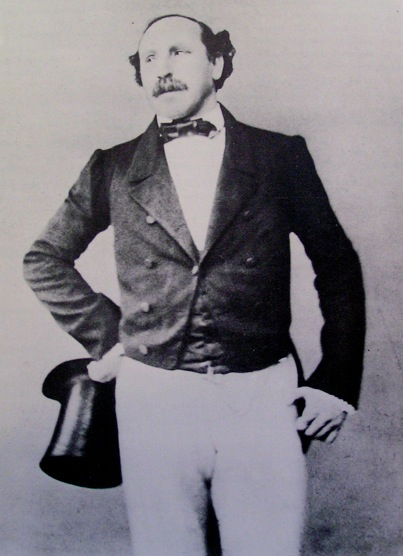
Ernst Renz

At that time, circus tents were relatively uncommon. Instead, touring circus companies performed in permanent venues. They were generally simple wooden structures but in major cities elaborate circus buildings in brick and stone became increasingly common. Ernst Renz, director of Circus Renz and artist who had made a fortune on his trade, had built extravagant circus buildings in cities such as Berlin, Hamburg, Vienna and Breslau. In Copenhagen he leased the new building on a three-year contract.

The first plans envisioned an extravagant building with an elaborate facade with statues and Greek columns but in the end a much simpler design was chosen. The Circus building was designed by the architect Henrik Vilhelm Brinkopff and built from 1885 to 1886 in the area outside the former Western City Gate which was Copenhagen's premier entertainment district with nearby venues such as Tivoli Gardens and National Scala. It was inaugurated by Cirkus Benneweis in 1882.

=== Early years of running ===
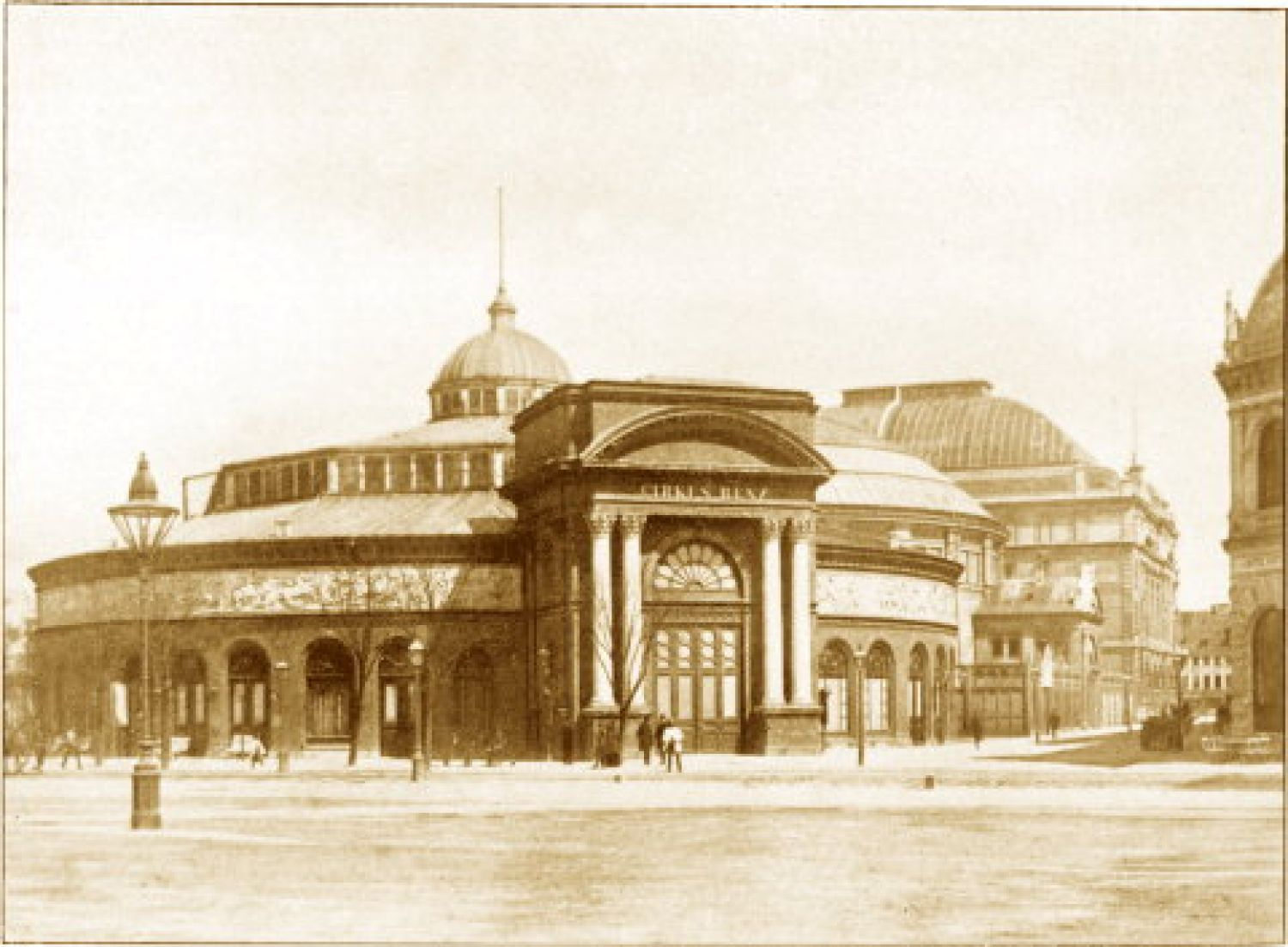
The Cirkus Building in 1886

The Circus Building was inaugurated on 8 May 1886 but Renz sub-rented the building in 1887 to his German colleague, Albert Schumann the Elder, who, a few years earlier, had opened a circus in the Swedish town of Malmö on the other side of the Øresund.

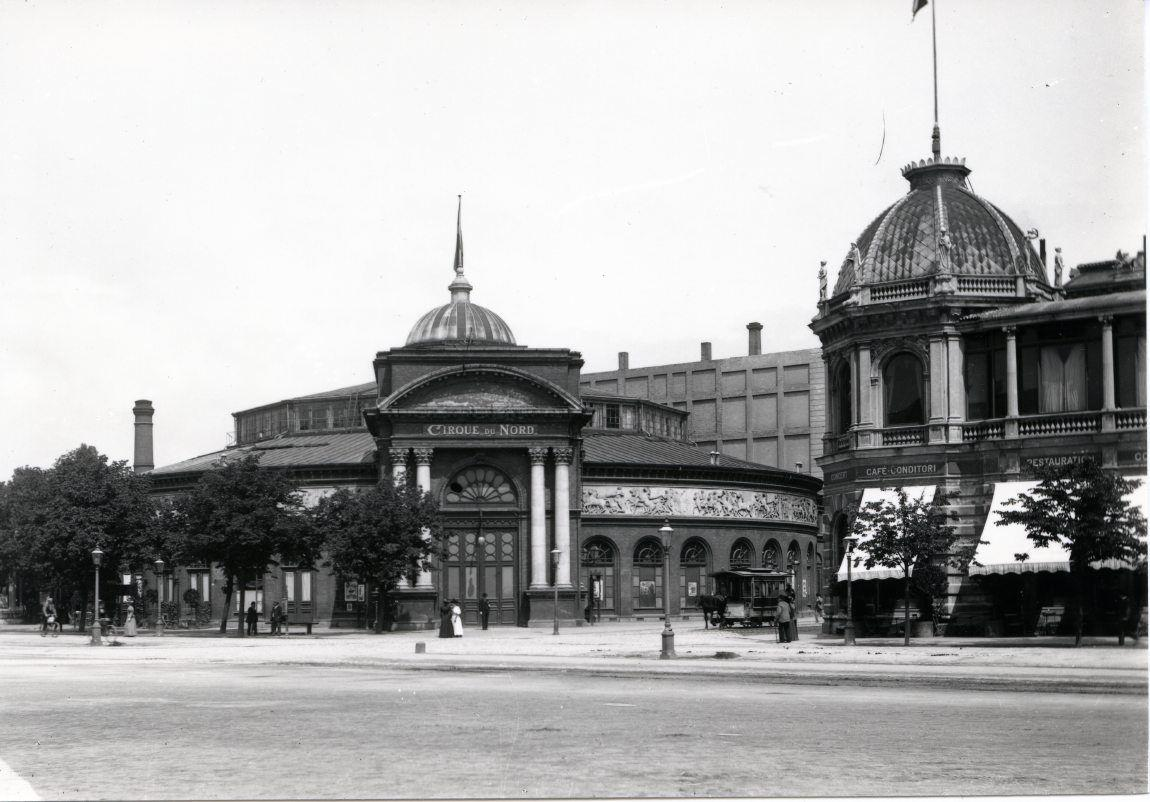
The Cirkus Building photographed by Frederik Riise in circa 1905

Renz did not renew his lease after the 1888 season and died in 1891. Instead the Circus building played host to performances by a variety of visiting foreign circus companies which passed through Copenhagen on their European tours.

In March 1914, the Circus building was devastated by a fire which left only the outer walls standing. It was quickly rebuilt, under the direction of the architect Holger Jacobsen, and reopened in 1915 with the German Zirkus Sarrasani as tenant.

=== Circus Schumann: 1918–1937 and 1943–1969 ===
In 1916, Cirkus Schumann performed in the building. The company was run by Willy, Ernst, and Oscar Schumann, nephews of Albert Schumann, after they had taken over the family business from their father, Max Schumann, the previous year. The Schumanns returned to the Circus building in 1918 and except for a few years' break during the beginning of World War II performed there every summer until 1968. During that period, their company was synonymous with circus in Denmark, and won a reputation as one of the best in Europe, particularly for equestrian presentations.

In 1963, a retail company, Anva, bought the Circus building to replace it with a modern department store but the plans were abandoned after massive protests and due to lack of funding. Still, due to escalating rent and the uncertainty about the building's future, Cirkus Schumann chose to leave the building in 1969.

=== Cirkus Benneweis era ===
The Schumanns were succeeded by another prominent Danish circus, Benneweis, headed by Eli Benneweis, presenting summer performances from 1970 to 1990. In 1974, the City bought the building and rented it out to the Benneweis family, who also became responsible for operating the World Cinema during the winter months.

In 1988, the Circus building was listed by the Danish Heritage Agency. After decreasing ticket sales, Circus Benneweis decided to leave the building in 1990. The building has since been used for a variety of activities and events, including musicals, ballet, conferences and concerts.

== Architecture ==
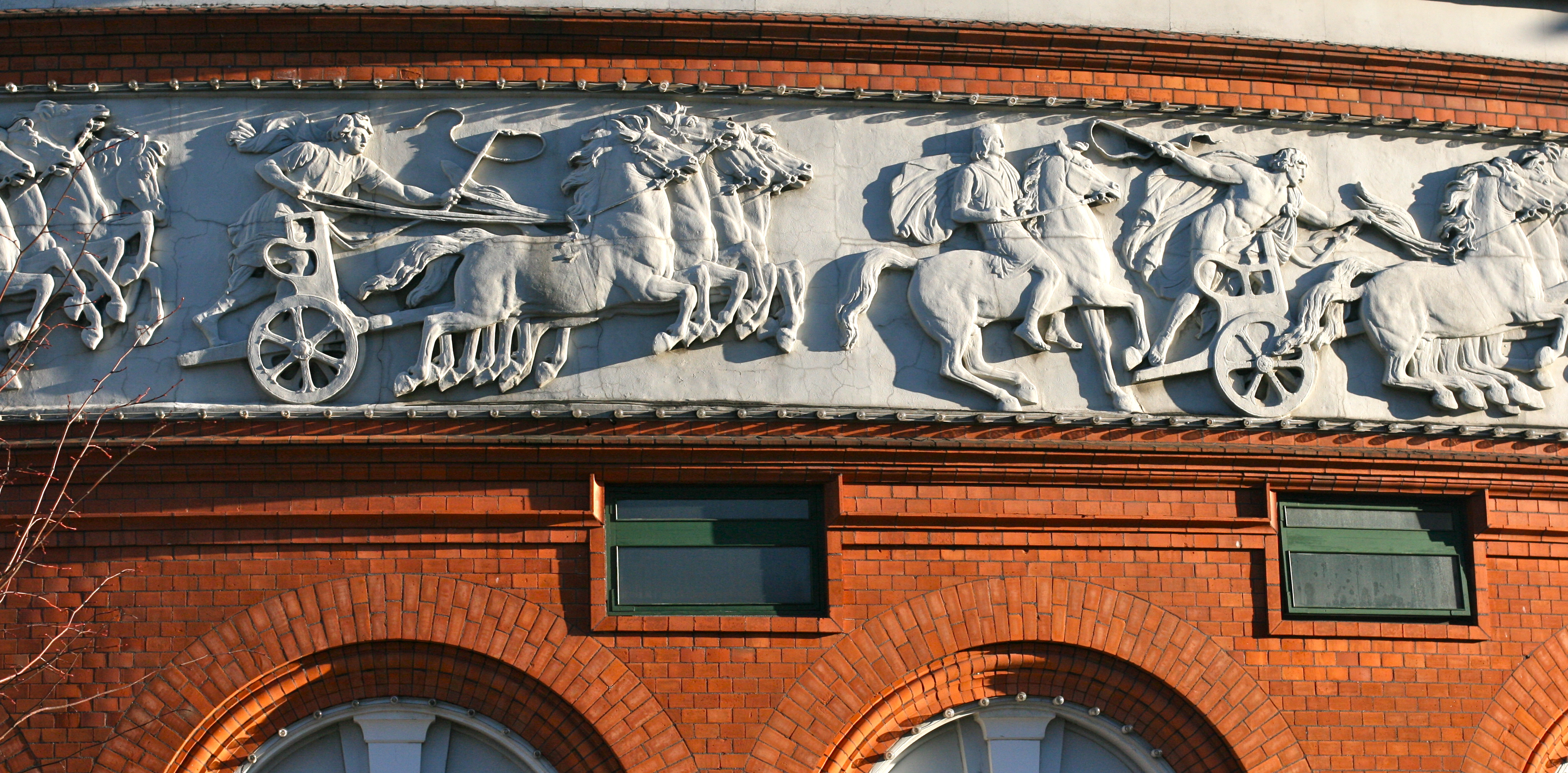
The frieze

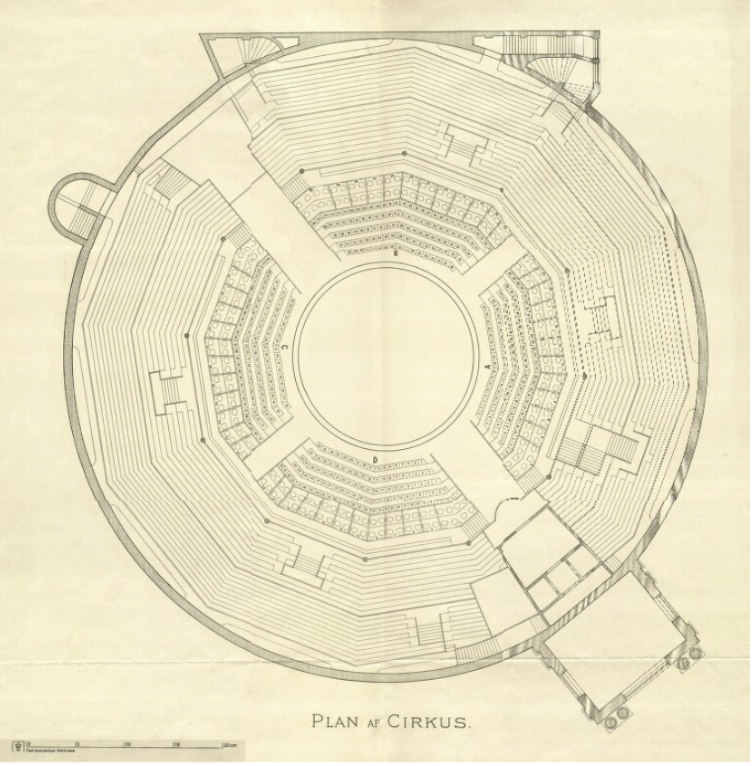
Plan of the building

The building is circular and topped by a shallow dome. The most distinctive feature of the facade is a frieze located just below the roof on the periphery of the outer wall. It was created by the sculptor Frederik Hammeleff and survived the fire in 1906. It depicts motifs from ancient Rome and Greece.

== Today ==
Since 2003, the building has been leased by Wallmans salonger, a Swedish entertainment company, which uses it for a dinner and entertainment venue.

== In popular culture ==
The Circus Building is used as a location in the 1973 Olsen-banden film The Olsen Gang Goes Crazy.
