= Holger Jacobsen =

Danish architect (1876–1960)

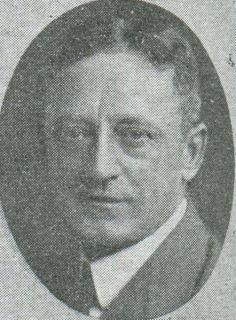
- Holger Jacobsen
- Born: 30 October 1876; Odense, Denmark
- Died: 27 March 1960 (aged 83); Copenhagen, Denmark
- Education: Royal Danish Academy of Fine Arts
- Occupation: Architect
- Awards: C. F. Hansen Medal (1926)
- Buildings: Stærekassen

Holger Jacobsen (30 October 1876 – 27 March 1960) was a Danish architect. His best known work is Stærekassen, an extension to the Royal Danish Theatre on Kongens Nytorv in Copenhagen.

== Biography ==
Holger Jacobsen was born on 30 October 1876 in Odense. He apprenticed as a carpenter and furthered his studies at Odense Technical School before attending the Royal Danish Academy of Fine Arts from 1898 to 1905 where he was a pupil of Hans Jørgen Holm for whom he also worked as an assistant. After his graduation he worked abroad for a couple of years, and was influenced by the Mannerism and Baroque architecture which he saw in France, Spain and Italy. Another source of inspiration was Vilhelm Wanscher's lectures on Michelangelo. He later described himself as the "last Italian in Danish architecture".

Jacobsen had his breakthrough with Bispebjerg Crematorium which was built from 1905 to 1906. Another early work was Taastrup New Church (1907) which was inspired by the architecture of northern Italy but in its details and interiors shows Jugendstil influences. He also undertook the rebuilding of the Circus Building in Copenhagen after it was devastated by fire in 1914 and led the completion of the new Copenhagen Police Headquarters (1922–24) after Hack Kampmann's death.

In 1925, Jacobsen published a proposal for an extension to the Royal Danish Theatre which had been suffering from lack of space ever since its inauguration in 1874. He was rewarded with the C. F. Hansen Medal the same year and when an architectural competition was held he won it with a modified entry which included two extra stories with facilities for the new National Danish Broadcasting Company. The building, which became known as the Nesting Box, was met with strong criticism, especially by Poul Henningsen and his consorts in the influential magazine Critical Review. From its opening in 1931, it was also challenged in terms of functionality.

His later works consists of mainly residential and some office buildings.

== Selected buildings ==
- Missionshus, Reerslev (1906)
- Bispebjerg Crematory, Nispebjerg, Copenhagen (1906–07, extended in 1905-06 and 1932–34)
- Taastrup New Church, Taastrup (1907)
- Forstædernes Bank, Glostrup (1907)
- East Chapel, Vestre Cemetery, Copenhagen (1912–13)
- Circus Building (rebuilding), Copenhagen (1914)
- Community house, Vestre Cemetery, Copenhagen (1915)
- Office building (alteration), Assistens Cemetery, Copenhagen (1916)
- Hunting lodge, Glimminge, Sweden (1917)
- Public housing, Birups Allé/Mågevej, Copenhagen (1918)
- Own summer house, Gilleleje (1919)
- Chapel and crematory, Sundby Cemetery, Copenhagen (1924)
- Own house, 6 Rosbæksvej, Copenhagen (1926)
- Villa, 1 Ceresvej Frederiksberg, Copenhagen (1928)
- Stærekassen, Kongens Nytorv, Copenhagen (1828–31, listed in 1995)
- Aarhus Privatbank, Århus (1930)

== Gallery ==
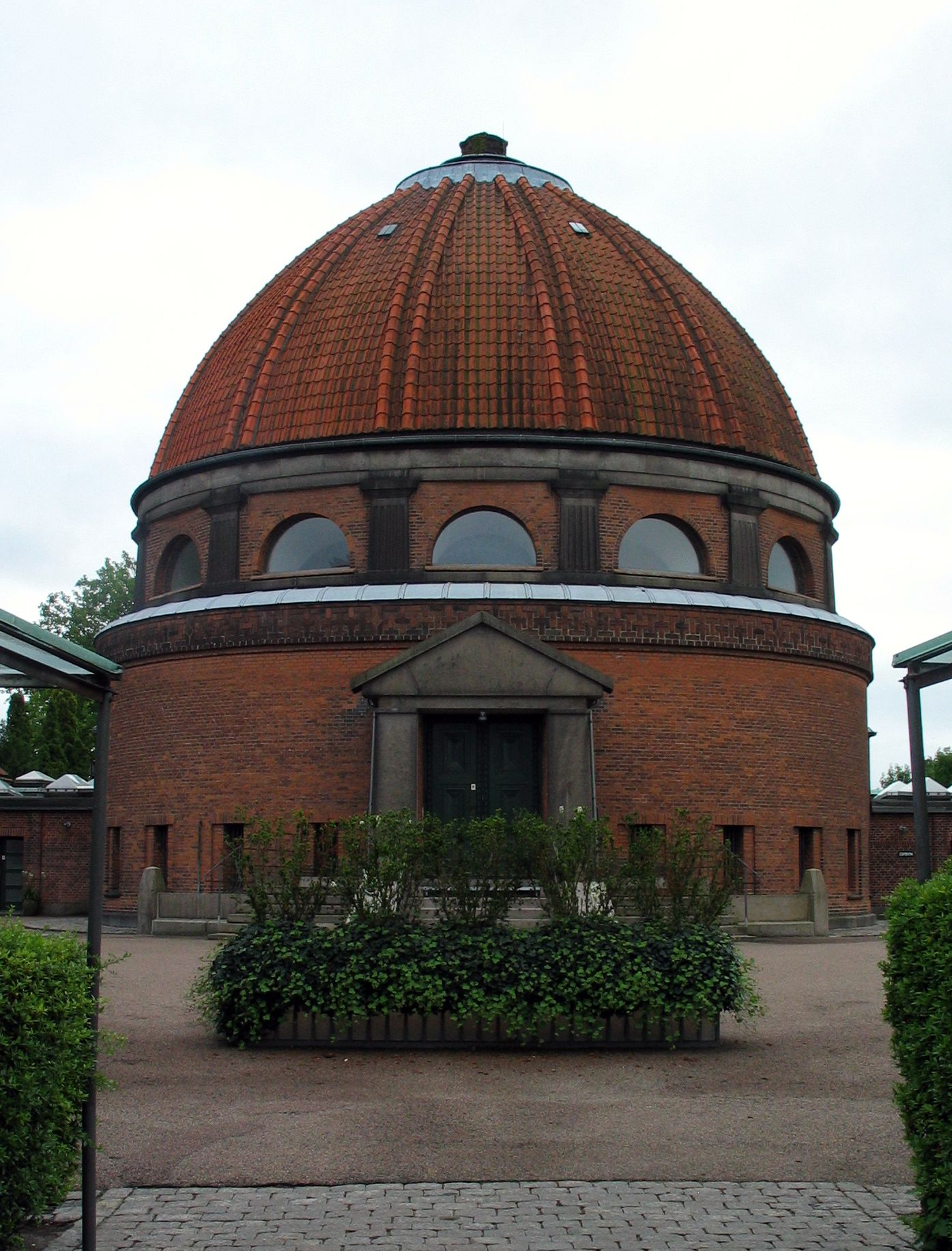
Bispebjerg Crematory, Copenhagen, 1906

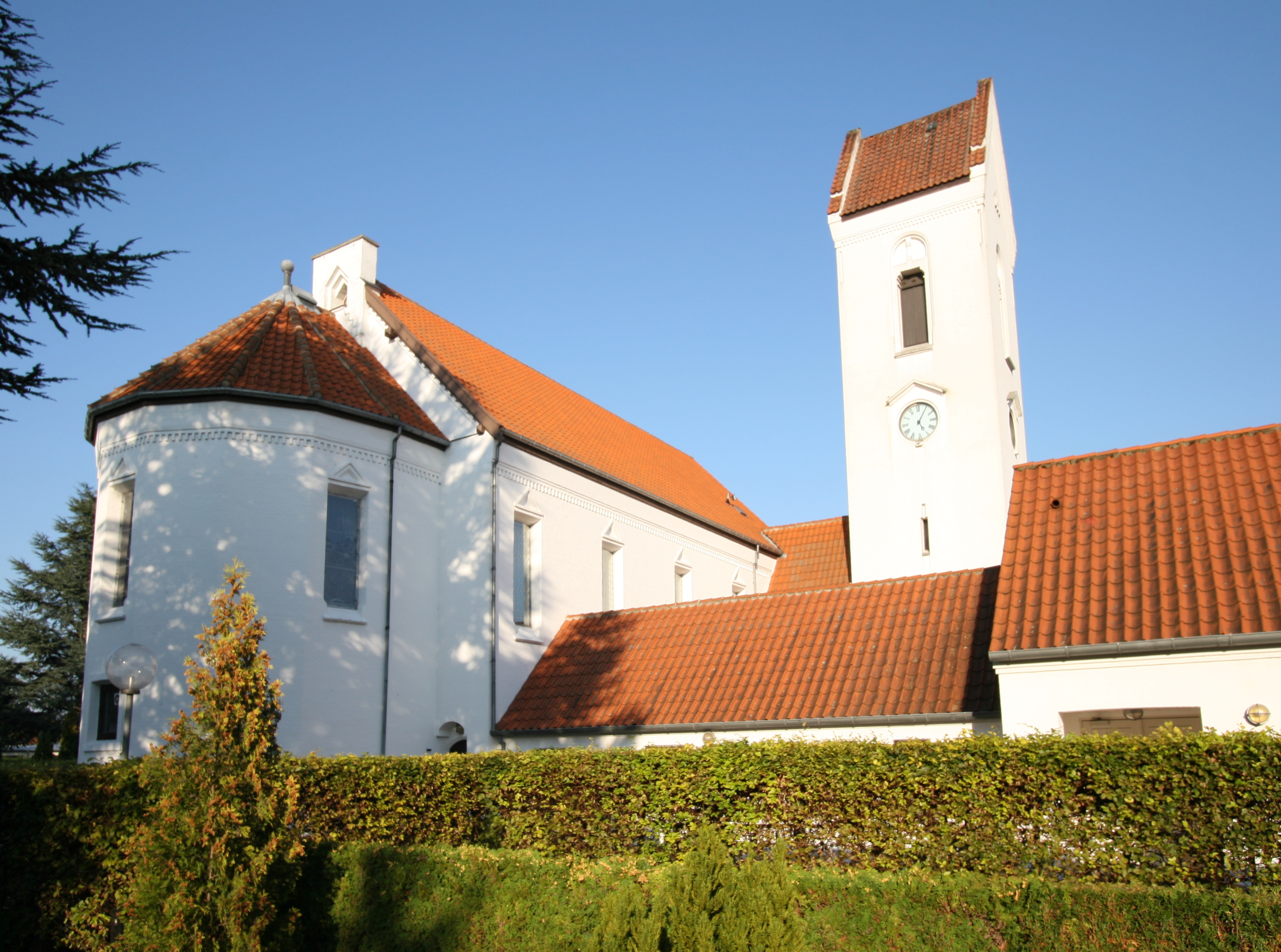
Taastrup New Church, Taastrup (1907)

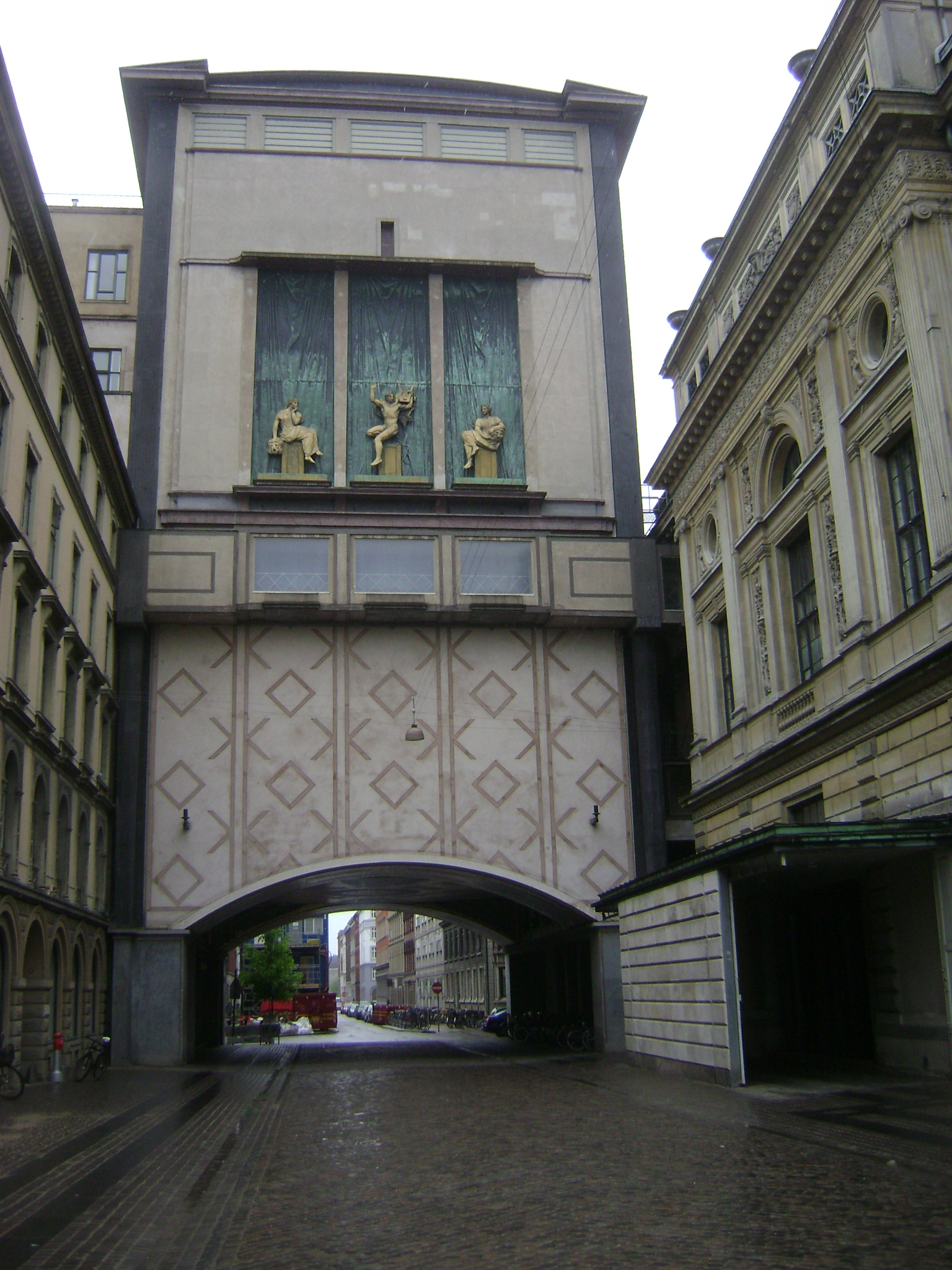
Stærekassen, Copenhagen (1931)

== See also ==
- List of Danish architects
