= Stærekassen =

Theatre building in Copenhagen, Denmark

- New Stage
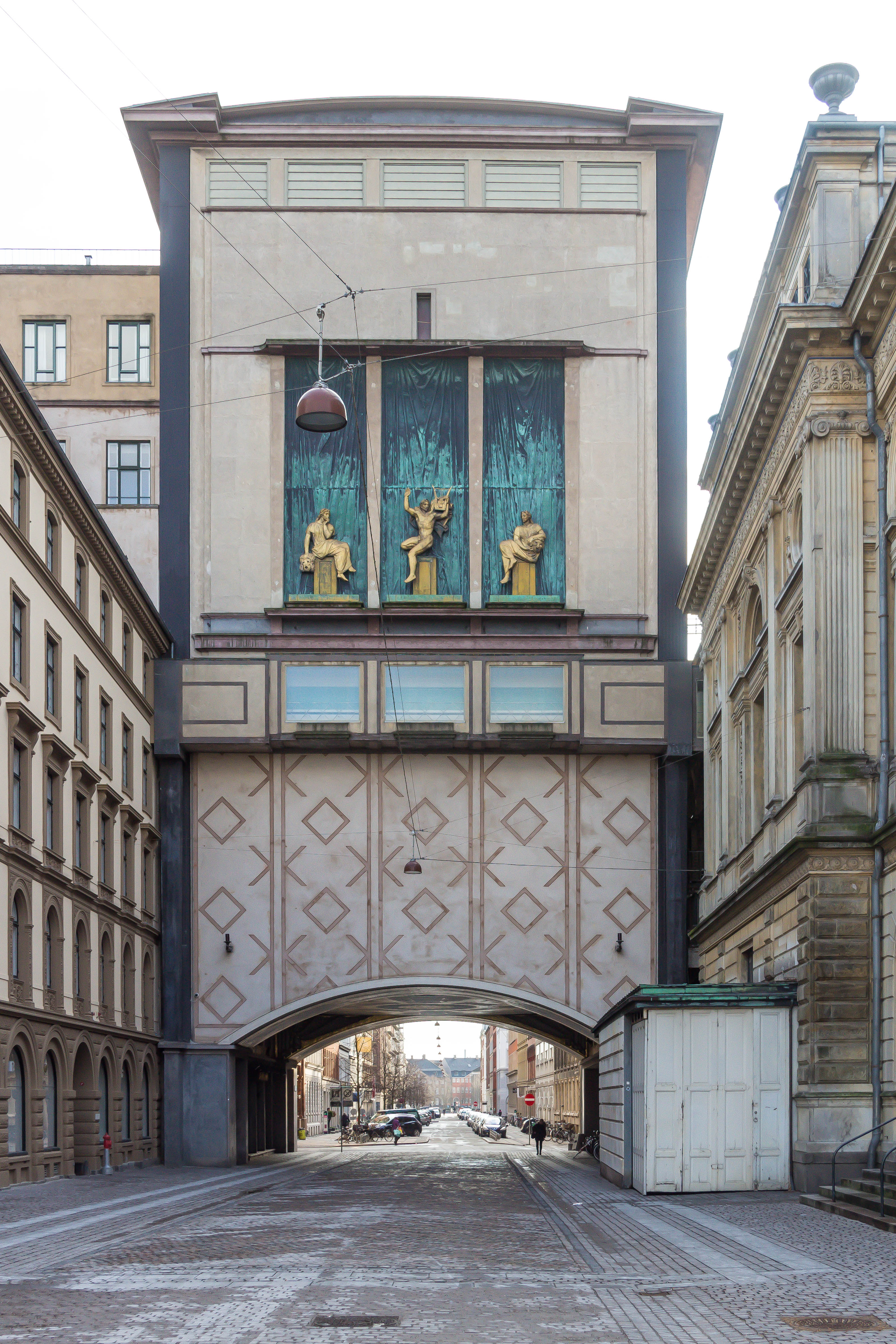
- Stærekassen seen from Kongens Nytorv
- Interactive map of Stærekassen
- Address: Kongens Nytorv; Copenhagen; Denmark
- Coordinates: 55.6792°N 12.5868°E
- Owner: Agency for Palaces and Cultural Properties (Denmark)
- Capacity: 775 numbered seats
- Type: Event venue (current)
- Designation: Listed in 1995

Construction
- Opened: 1931
- Closed: 2008
- Architect: Holger Jacobsen

Stærekassen (lit. 'The Starling Nest Box'), also known as Ny Scene (English: New Stage) is a theatre building annexed to the Royal Danish Theatre on Kongens Nytorv in Copenhagen, Denmark. It opened in 1931 to serve a dual purpose as an additional stage for the Royal Theatre and the first home of the new Danish Broadcasting Corporation. The colloquial name, which has now obtained official status, refers to the design of the stage tower in the shape of a box suspended above the street, and in the initial design proposals with a large round window high up as the dominating ornamental feature of the facade.

== History ==
When the Danish Broadcasting Corporation was founded in 1925, it was based in very small premises on Købmagergade. The first director of the new State Radio was the chamber singer Emil Holm and one of his ambitions was to establish a radio symphony orchestre in Copenhagen. In 1928 the State Radio relocated to rented rooms in the Axelborg building on Vesterbrogade, a former bank headquarters, but the need for more suitable facilities, with proper broadcasting studios and a concert hall, soon became evident.

In the same time, the Royal Danish Theatre had been in need of more space ever since the inauguration of its new building in 1874, and in particular a venue which was better suited for the more Naturalistic plays. The past half century had seen a number of proposals for expansions and various existing buildings, such as the Dagmar Theatre, the Court Theatre and even Magasin du Nord, had been brought into play as a possible additional venue for the theatre. Architects such as Christian Hansen, Erik Bunch and Holger Jacobsen had published detailed proposals long before any competition was launched.

In the end it was decided to combine the needs of the two national institutions and an architectural competition was held which was won by Holger Jacobsen.

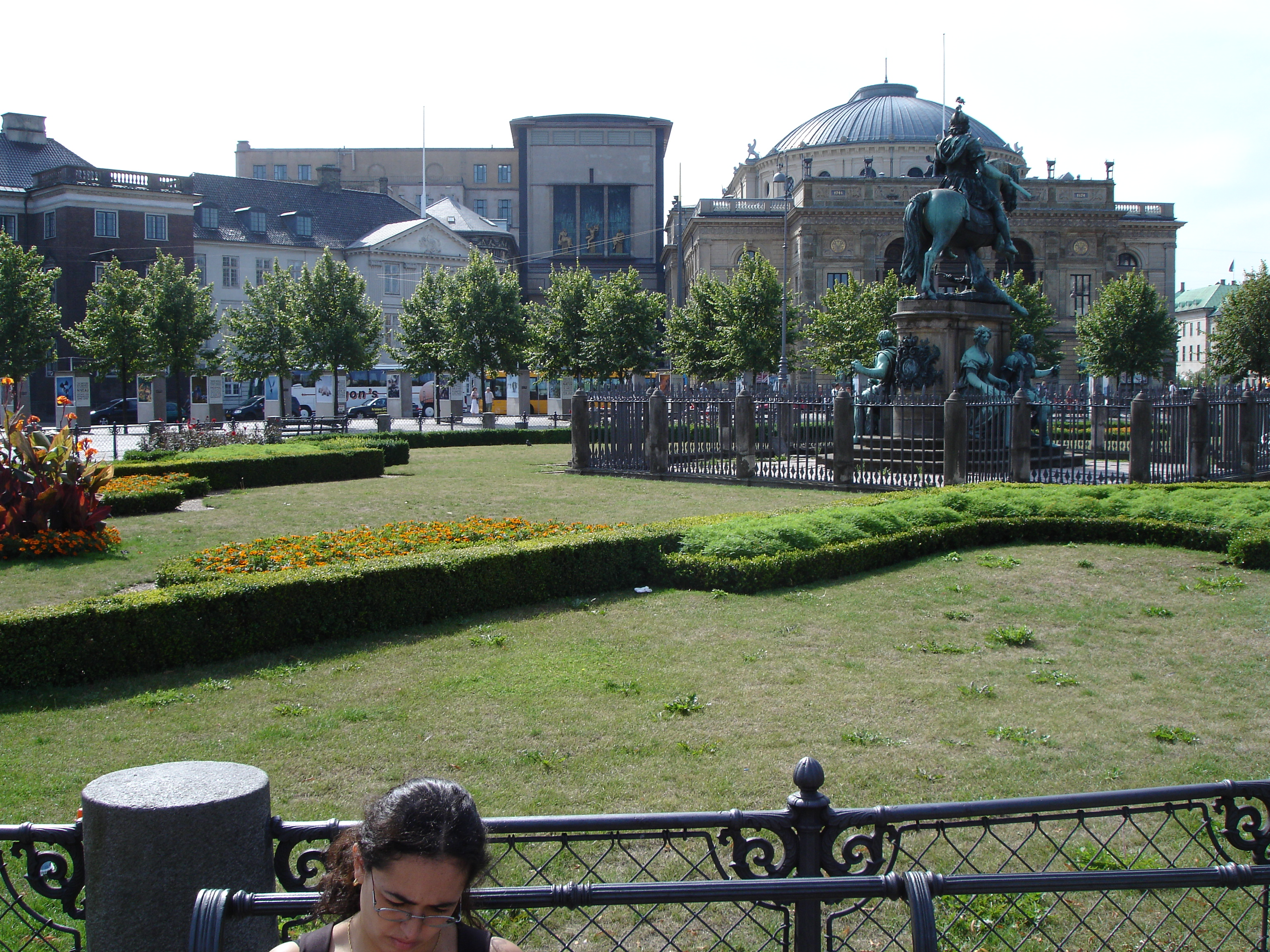
The location next to Old Stage

As soon as the first renderings were published, the project was met with criticism and soon nicknamed Stærekassen (Starling Nest Box) due to its unusual design which at first included a large, round window high up on the facade toward Kongens Nytorv.

The new building was inaugurated in 1931 but from the beginning failed to satisfy the demands of its two tenants. The theatre complained about the facilities for the audience and in the same time ceiling which separated the main auditorium from the combined radio studios and rehearsal rooms was inadequately sound isolated, making it impossible for the orchestre to practice under theatre performances. The Radio Orchestre therefore kept the premises in Axelborg for rehearsals and had to move all instruments back and forth for the weekly public concert in the Nest Box's main auditorium, but after two seasons the Royal Theatre terminated the contract

As the Broadcasting Copporation grew up through the 30s, the need for more spacious and technically advanced premises arose once again and a new Radio Building was inaugurated in 1940 to the design of the Modernist architect Vilhelm Lauritzen although its concert hall was not completed until after World War II. By that time the Royal Theatre had moved into the Nest Box once again, using it as a venue for modern drama in accordance with the original plans.

The Royal Theatre left Stærekassen in 2008, when the new Royal Danish Playhouse was inaugurated on the waterfront.

== Architecture and artwork ==
The building consists of a high stage tower which spans Tordenskjoldsgade and connects Vilhelm Dahlerup's old theatre building from 1874 with a new corner building which the auditorium is found. The interior is richly decorated in Art Déco style by the leading Danish artists of the period.

=== Facade reliefs ===
The facade reliefs on both sides of the stage tower are executed in Bronze and designed by Einar Utzon-Frank. The reliefs on the front towards Kongens Nytorv depict Apollo, God of musicians, flanked by the Muse of Tragedy, on his right hand side, and the Muse of comedy on his left hand side. On the opposite side of the tower, Mozart with violin, representing music, is seen flanked by Eros on the swan representing dance, and Shakespeare drama.

=== Passageway mosaic ===
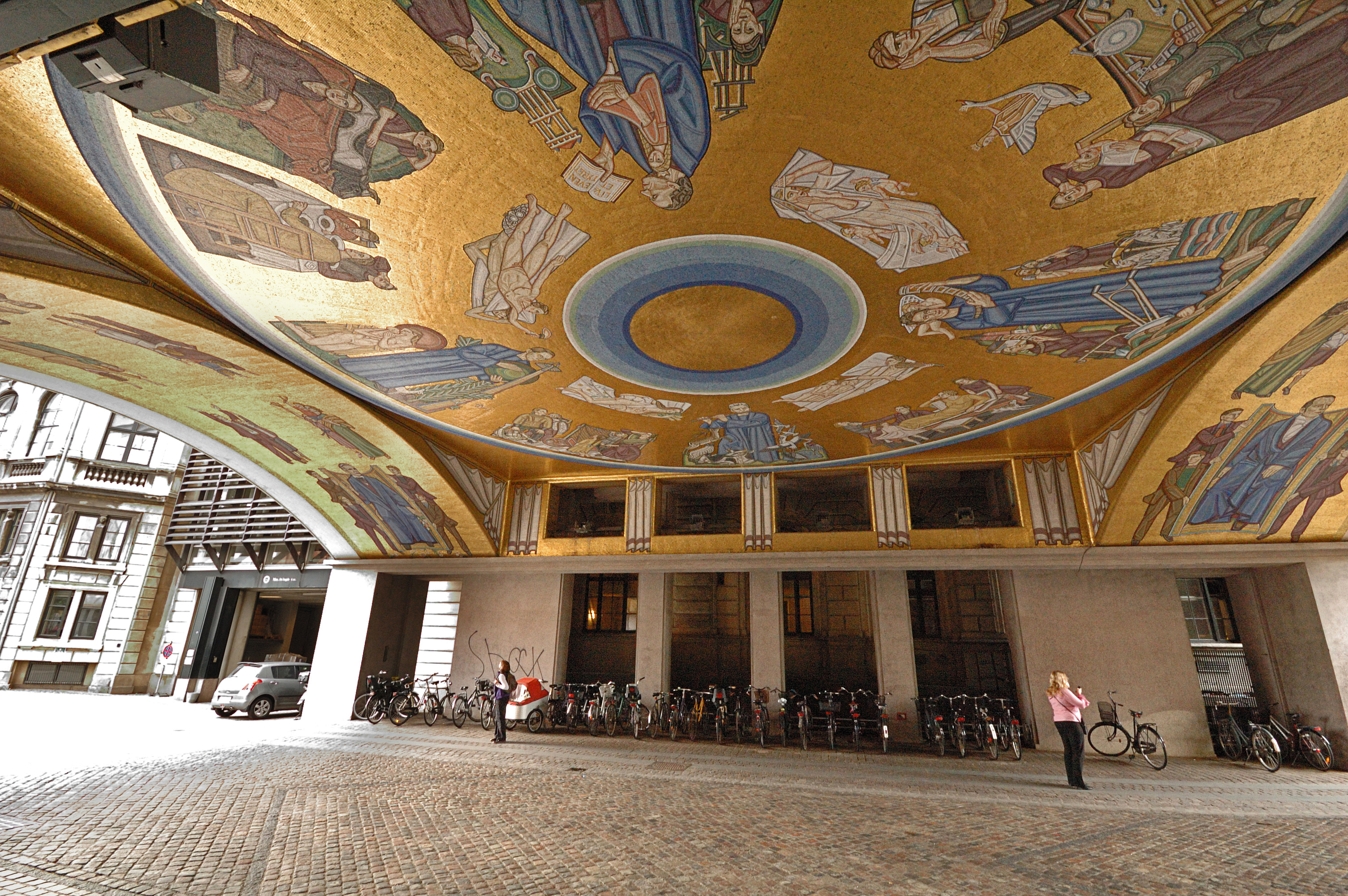
The mosaic in the arched passage

In the arched passage under the stage tower is decorated with a large mosaic by Ejnar Nielsen. It is composed of three million pieces of glass from mosaic factories in Venice. The world of the arts is represented by figures of Hans Christian Andersen, Carl Nielsen and others, whilst the world of radio is represented by physicist such as Hans Christian Ørsted and Niels Bohr.

== Today ==
After the Royal Danish Theatre abandoned the building in 2008, it was handed over to the Palaces and Properties Agency which now rents it out for cultural event, or to companies, organisers, public institutions and other interested parties. The auditorium is best suited for theatre performances, concerts and small conferences. The foyer has service functions and toilet facilities and is mainly used for receptions.

== See also ==
- Brønnum House
