= National Scala =

Former entertainment venue

Coordinates: 55°40′31″N 12°33′56″E

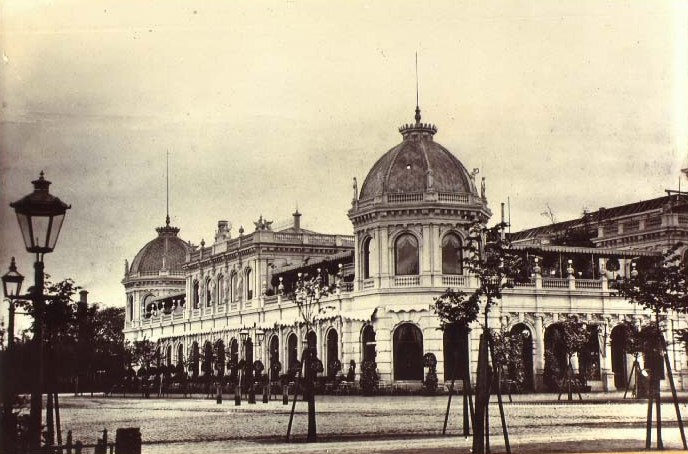
National Scala Kastellet

National Scala was an entertainment venue opposite Tivoli Gardens on Vesterbrogade in Copenhagen, Denmark. The building was later converted into a shopping centre and demolished in 2013.

== History ==
=== Background ===
The building's history can be traced back to a pavilion built by Kongens Klub ("King's Club") some 200 metre further to the west in 1846. It was dismantled when the Zealand Railway Company constructed Copenhagen's new central station, in 1864, and rebuilt on the corner of Vester Farimagsvej (now Axeltorv) and Vesterbro Passage (now Vesterbrogade). In 1872, a new owner changed its name to Café Boulevard .

=== Etablissementet National ===
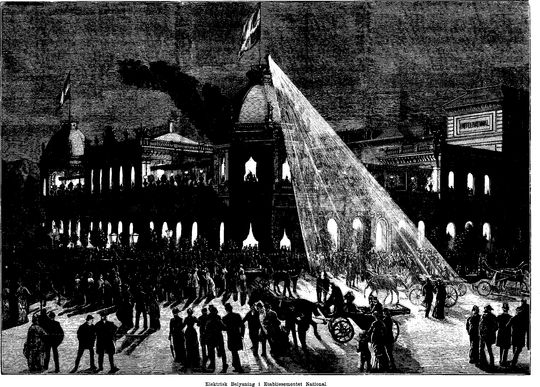
The opening night, illustration from Illustreret Tidende

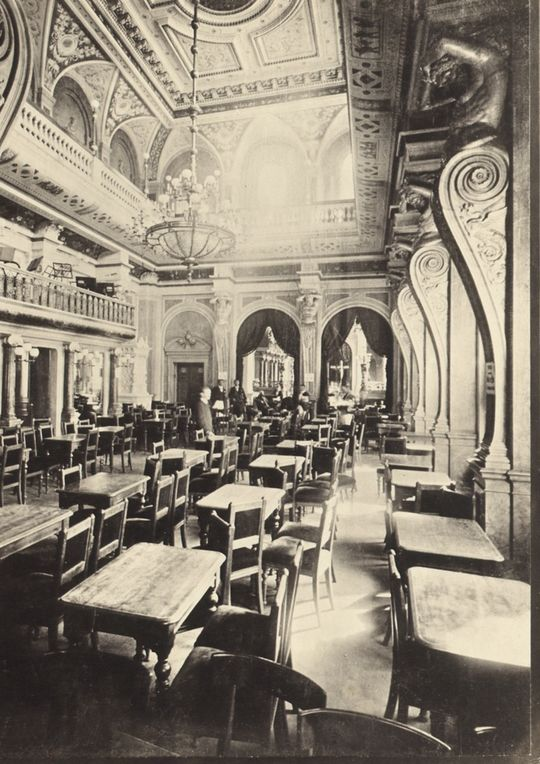
Interior

In 1880, Hans Hansen, a well-known developer of the time, acquired the property. He commissioned Henrik Vilhelm Brinkopff to expand the complex and changed its name to Etablissementet National. At its opening on 15 January 1882, it was the first building in Copenhagen to feature electric light. It contained 73 electric lamps and had a spotlight on the top of one of the corner towers casting light onto the pavement below. The old part of the building was replaced by a new, circular concert hall, again with Brinkopff as the architect, which was inaugurated on 13 October 1893. In 1884, Hans Hansen went bankrupt and National Scala was taken over by a newly founded company. In the 1890s, the repertoire consisted mainly of theatre. The restaurant was called Euterpe.

=== La Scala and Scala-teatret ===
Thor Jensen, an entrepreneur who had returned from the US, then took over the building, introduced a cabarets and changed the name to La Scala in 1898. The orchestra was led by Georg Lundbye, H. C. Lundbye's son. One of the main attractions were the singer Dagmar Hansen while the American illusionist and escape artist Harry Houdini were among the guest performers.

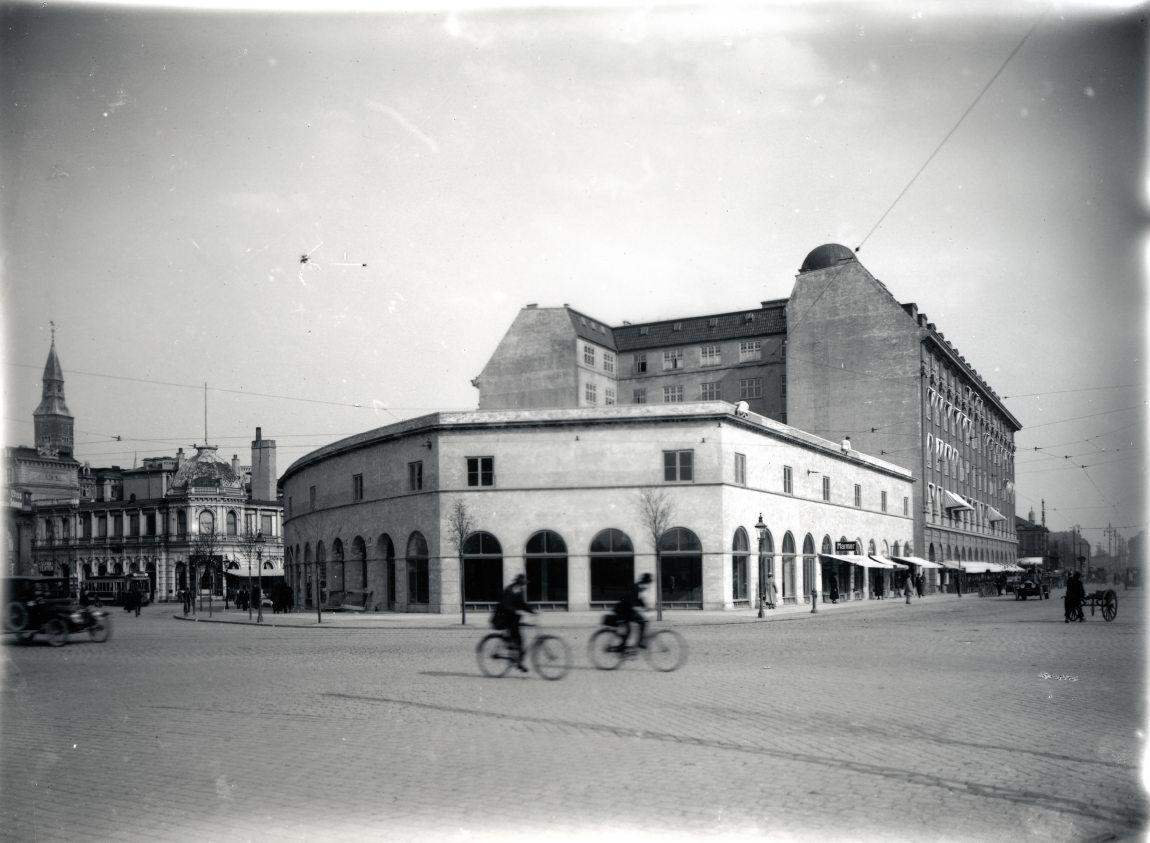
Scala-teatret in 1922 (on the left in the background)

Between 1912 and 1927, with Frede Skaarup as owner and theatre director, Scala experienced a renaissance under the name Scala-teatret. The repertoire was operettas and revues, featuring popular artists such as Liva Weel and Carl Alstrup.

=== National-Scala ===
The run-down Scala-teater closed in 1930. The building then went through a comprehensive renovation under supervision of the engineer Christen Ostenfeld, his first major assignment, and the name was changed to National-Scala. It went through another modernization in 1937 before finally closing in 1957 with debts of $150,000 and the loss of 275 jobs. Its last big hit was a three-week stint by Josephine Baker in 1955.

=== Anva and Scala ===
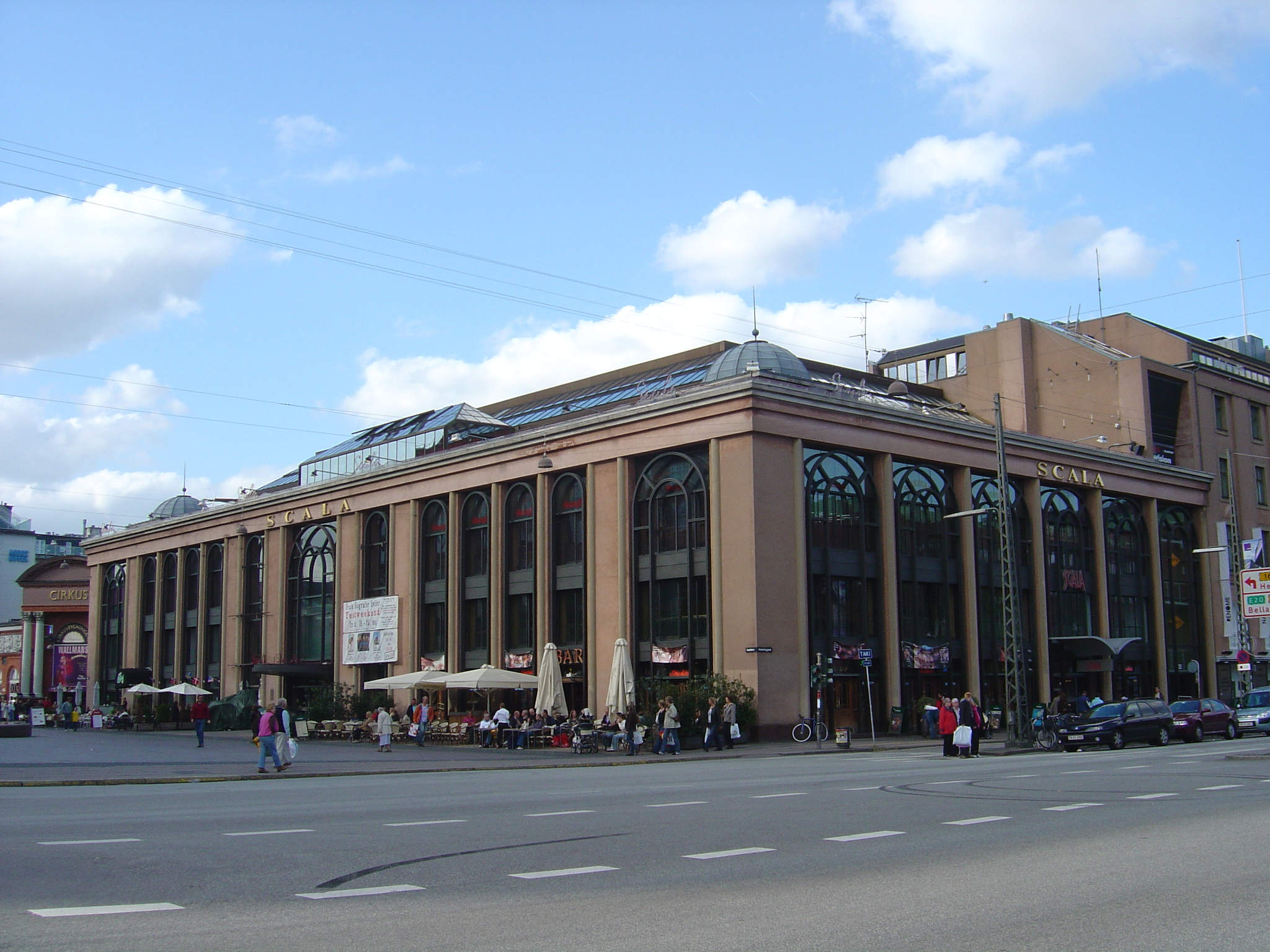
The Scala building

The building was acquired by FDB, demolished and replaced by the Anva department store.

In the 1980s, the building was acquired by a consortium of investors, including Bent Fabricius-Bjerre. It reopened as a shopping mall after a major renovation in 1989, containing five cinemas, 12 restaurants, fitness centre as well as stores. It was never a success and changed hands several times up through the 1990s.

In 2007, a new owner, Centerplan, decided to demolish the building, launching an invited architectural competition for the site, prior to the company's bankruptcy in 2008. The participants in the competition included 3XN, Schmidt Hammer Lassen Architects and Plot. In 2011, Ejendomsselskabet Norden together with ATP, PFA and Industriens Pension acquired the building. New plans for the site were released in 2011 and the building was finally demolished in 2012.

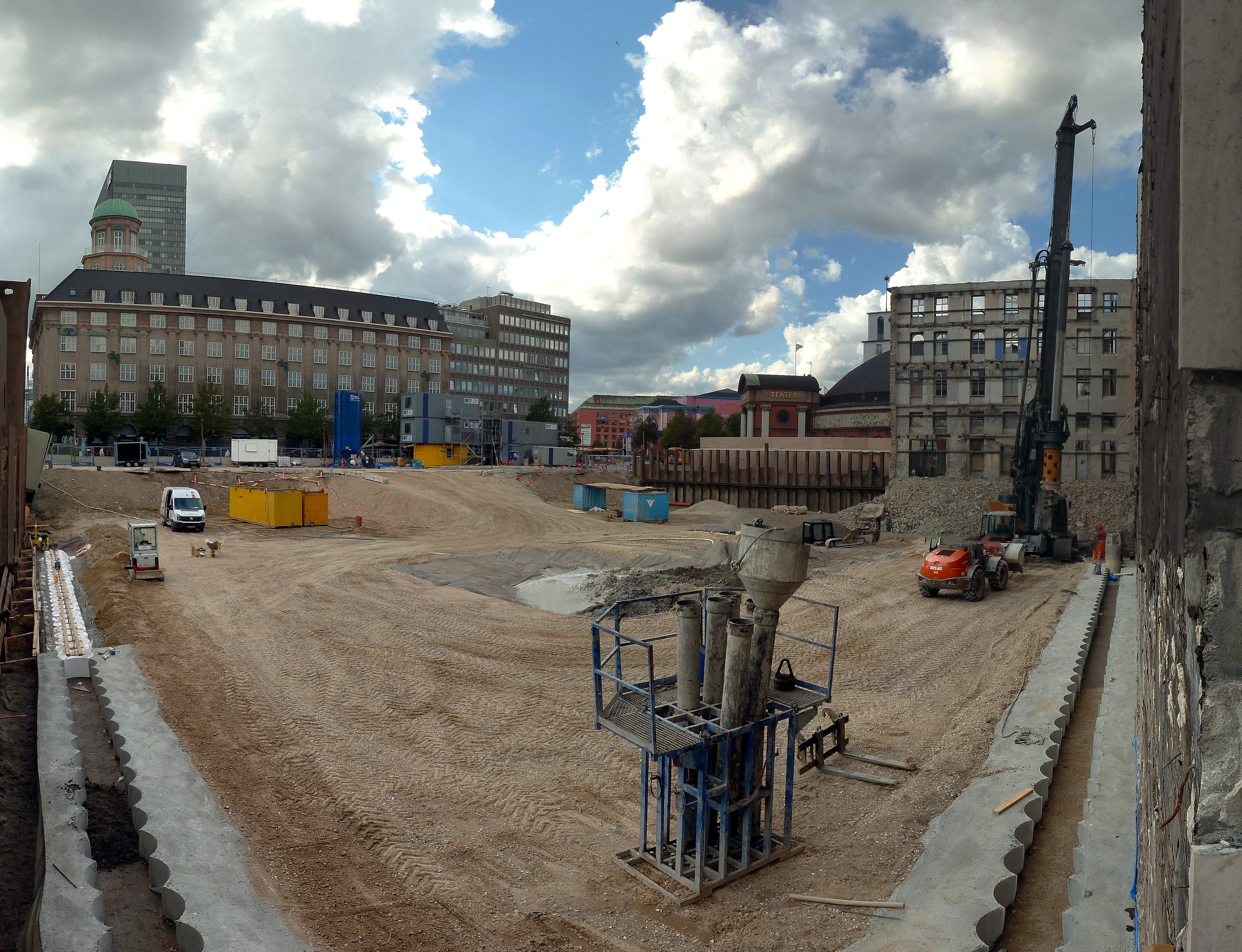
The construction site of the Scala Project

== The Scala Project ==
The new project for the site consists of five cylinders of varying height and interconnected by skyways, positioned on a one-storey plinth. The project also proposes a renovation of the square that will enhance Fortification Ring's character of being a "green belt"surrounding the city centre.
