= Bispebjerg Cemetery =

Cemetery in Copenhagen

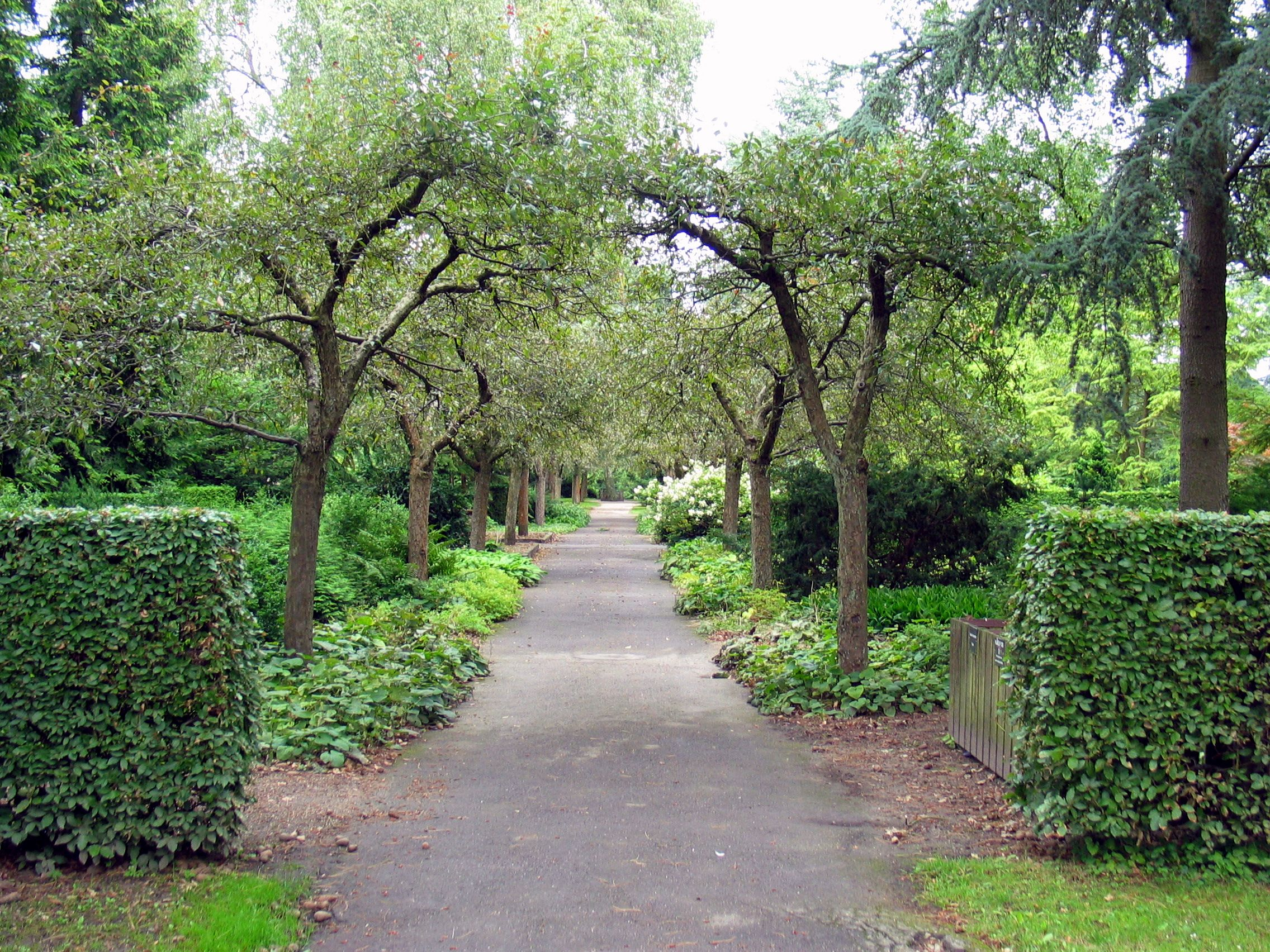
- Interactive map of Bispebjerg Cemetery

Details
- Established: 1903
- Location: Copenhagen
- Country: Denmark
- Coordinates: 55°42′51″N 12°31′32″E
- Size: 43.6 ha (108 acres)
- Website: Official website

Bispebjerg Cemetery (Danish: Bispebjerg Kirkegård), established in 1903 on the moderately graded north slope of Bispebjerg Hill, is the newest of five municipal cemeteries in Copenhagen, Denmark. The main entrance to the cemetery is located next to the monumental Grundtvig's Church, built later in 1921–40. A tall poplar avenue extends from the main entrance towards Utterslev Mose in the west. The old chapel has been converted into a centre for dance and is now known as Dansekapellet (Chapel of Dance). One of the cemetery’s main attractions is an avenue of Japanese cherry trees that, when in bloom during spring, form a long, pink tunnel.

== History ==
Bispebjerg Cemetery was established in 1903 to release the pressure on Copenhagen's other cemeteries. The plan was designed by Edvard Glæsel.

== Buildings ==
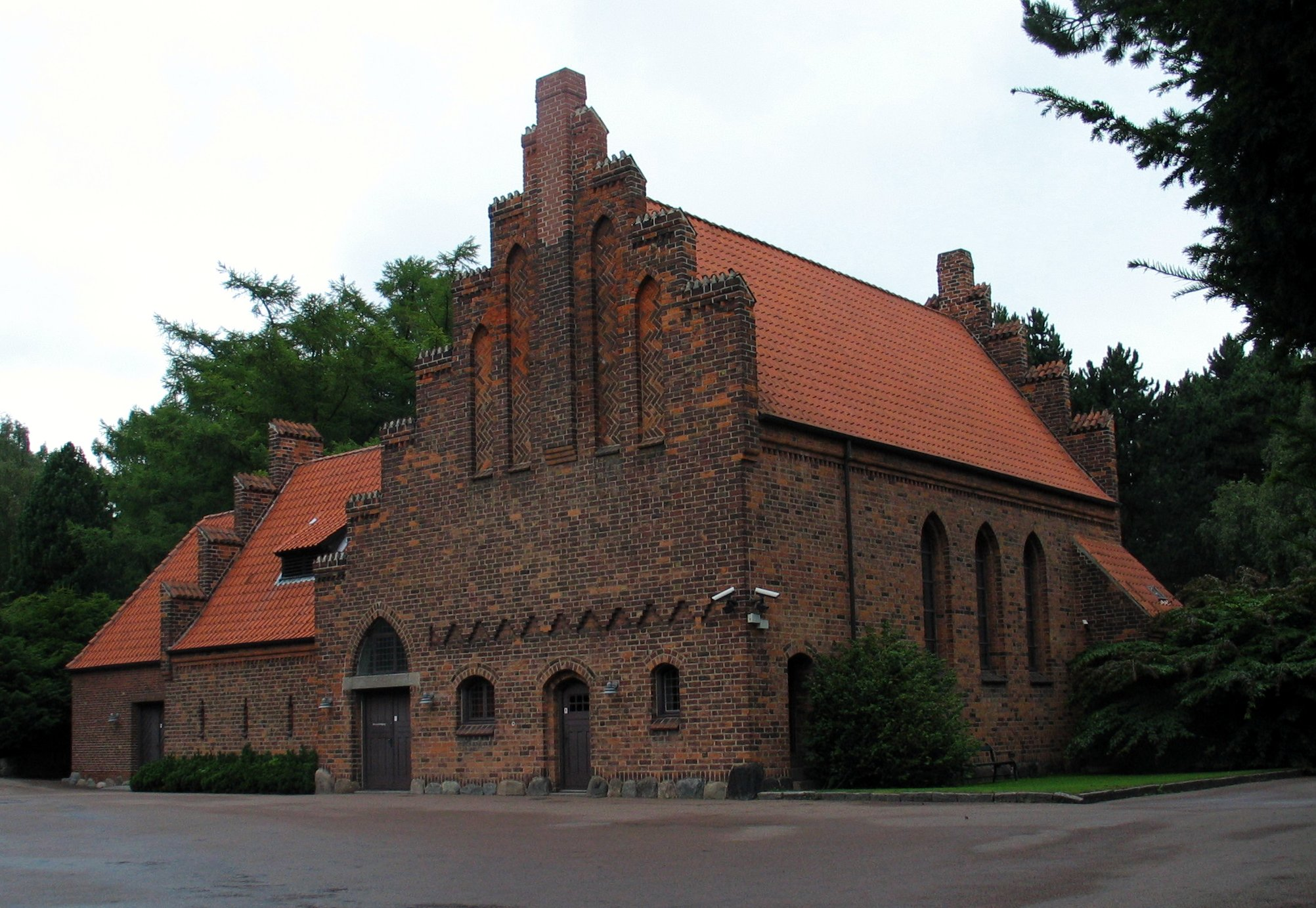
The South Chapel

=== Chapel and administration building ===
The architect Andreas Clemmensen have designed most of the buildings in the cemetery. His contributions include the main entrance, the administration building at Frederiksborgvej 125 (1903), the North Chapel (1910), now used as a storage building, the South Chapel (1912), which in 1931 was rebuilt to designs by architect Tyge Hvass. Clemmensen also designed the East Chapel which was extended by Tyge Hvass in 1930 but demolished in 2001.

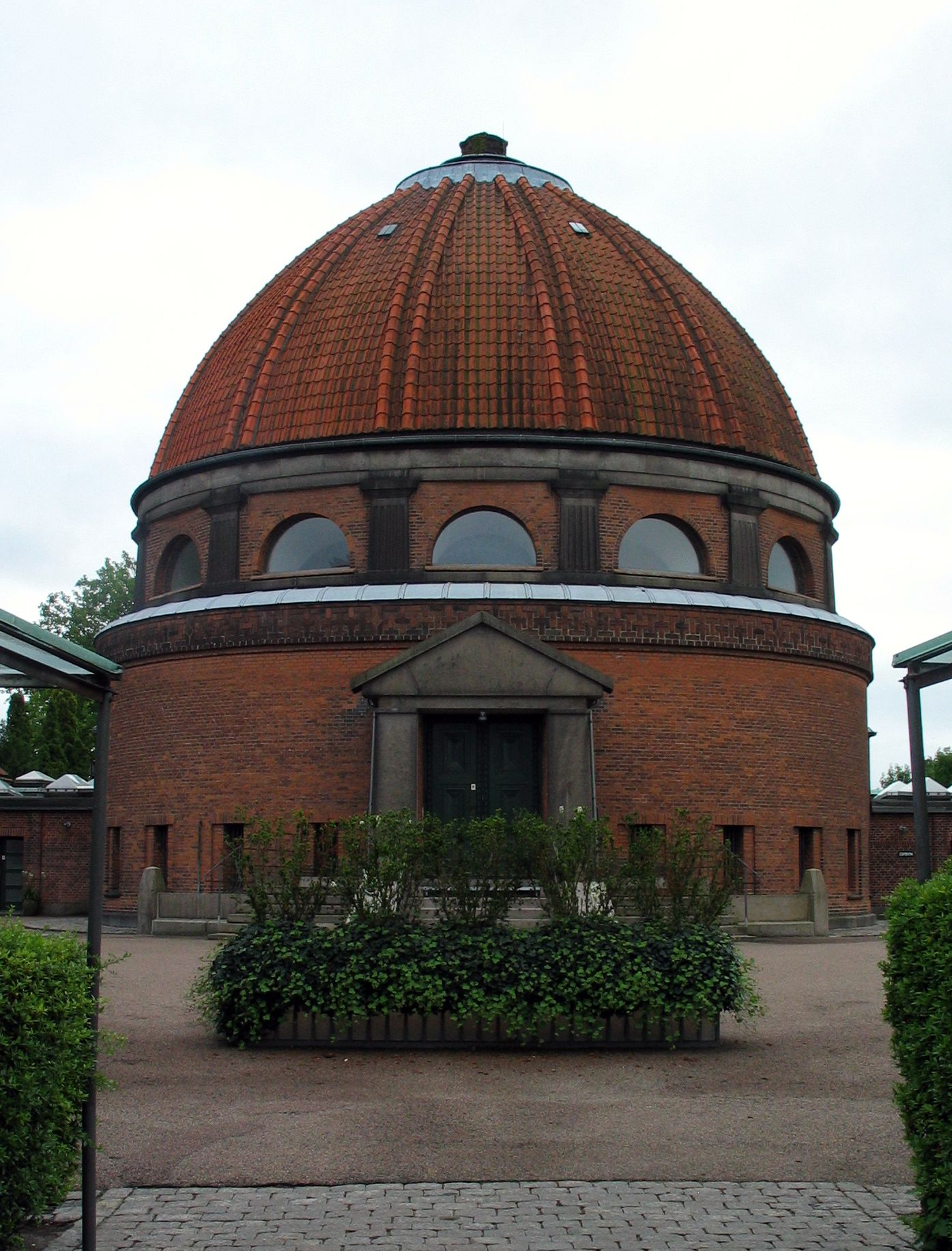
The old crematory building, now Dansekapellet

=== Old crematory and personnel building ===
The old crematory was designed by Holger Jacobsen as the result of an architectural competition. The building was completed in 1907 with inspiration from Roman architecture. and later extended in 1915–16 and 1932–34. The building has now been converted into a venue for modern dance, Dansekapellet.

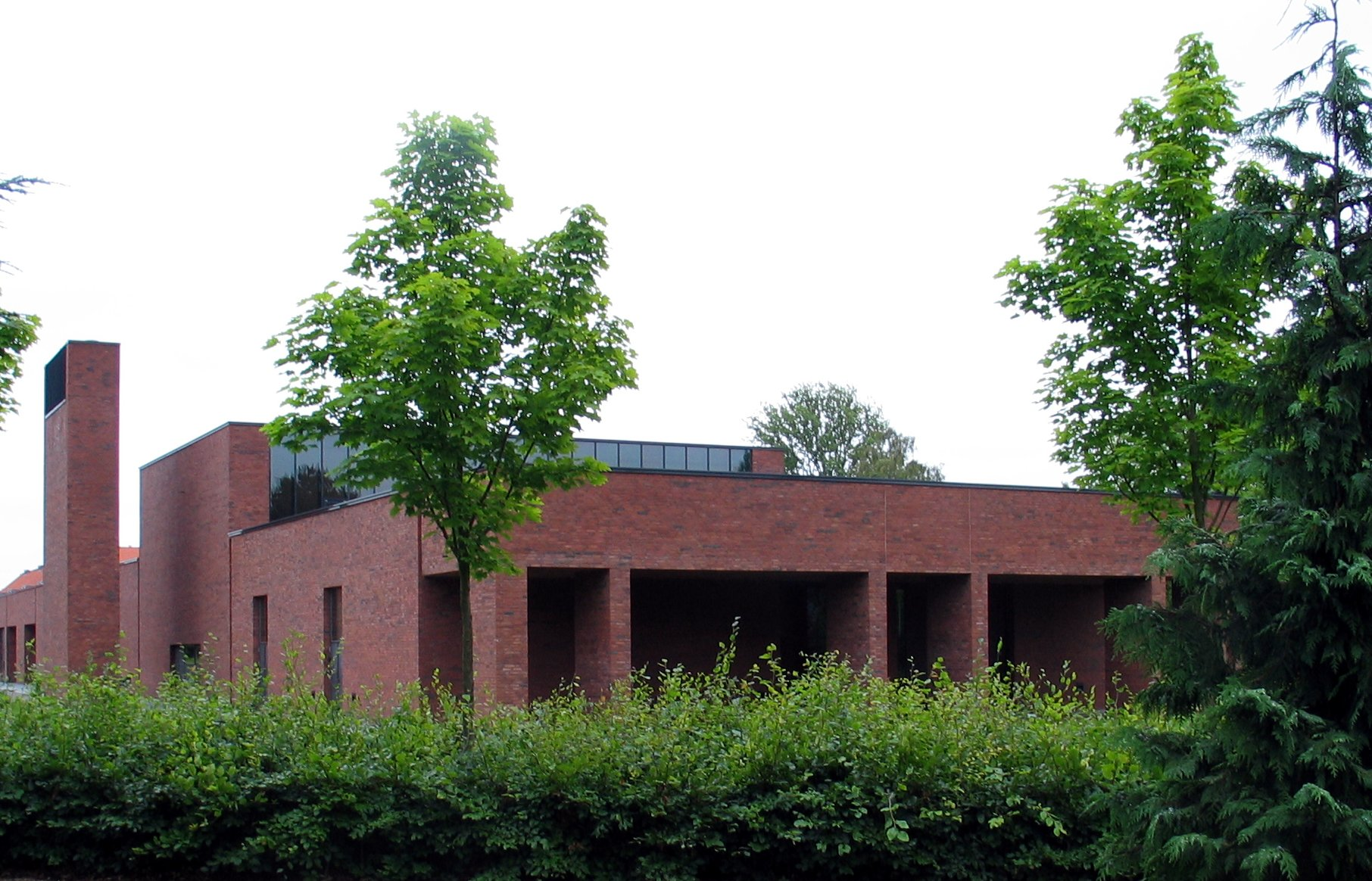
The new crematory

Holger Jacobsen has also designed a cluster of buildings in the northwestern corner of the cemetery. They date from 1916 and were used for storage purposes and personnel. Tyge Hvass added a stables building in 1935 and was also responsible for a larger extension of Jacobsen's buildings I 1945.

=== Crematory ===
A new crematory was inaugurated on 14 January 2003. The building was designed by Friis & Moltke.

== Sections ==
The old communal burial site features a monument by Holger Jacobsen. The new communal burial site features a sculpture by Knud Nellemose.

The Swedish section was established in 1927 and moved to the current location in Section 5 in 1957. It was designed by Sven-Ingvar Andersson. Other special sections are dedicated to Swedish, Russian, Catholic and Muslim graves. There is also a columbarium with a special room dedicated to Buddhist urns.

=== World War II ===
In the southwestern corner of the cemetery is a section dedicated to Danish soldiers, police officers and resistance fighters who died in World War II. The complex was designed by city architect Poul Holsøe and features a monument created by the sculptor Povl Søndergaard. Another monument commemorates the resistance fighters who died at two incidents on 29 August 1943 and 19 September 1944. It was designed by Povl Søndergaard in 1947.

The area also features a group of graves of British soldiers with traditional British Commonwealth war grave headstones and a Cross of Sacrifice. Many of the interred were crew members of British aircraft that were shot down over Zealand. The British casualties were buried at the site upon orders from the German occupying forces but most of them were transferred to Vestre Cemetery in March 1944.

Section 10 also features 16 graves of Soviet soldiers who died in Denmark during and immediately after the war. A monument designed by the Russian artist Anatolij Dioma was installed in 1990.

Section 8 contains 594 German refugees and 370 German soldiers from March 1944.

== Notable people ==
The writer Johannes V. Jensen, chess player Aron Nimzowitsch and the sculptor Astrid Noack are interred in at the Old communal burial site. The architect and writer Poul Henningsen, former lord mayor of Copenhagen Egon Weidekamp and Nobel Prize-winning chemist Henrik Dam are interred in the new communal burial site.
