= Henrik Vilhelm Brinkopff =

Danish architect

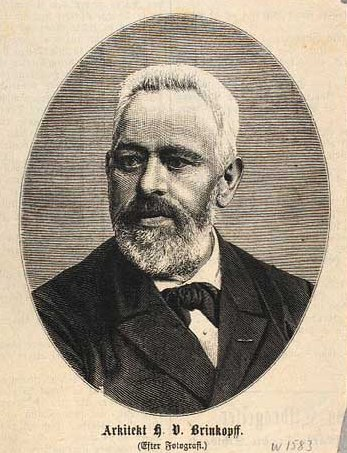
Henrik Vilhelm Brinkopff.

Henrik Vilhelm Brinkopff (30 June 1823 – 15 May 1900) was a Danish architect.

== Biography ==
Brinkopff was born in Copenhagen, Denmark. He was the son of Heinrich Brinkopff and Johanne Marie Høygaard. From 1847, he worked in his profession as a sculptor and as a designer and gilder in Copenhagen. He was the co-owner of the image cutting company Brinkopff & Sehnen from 1869 to 1872.

From 1872, he worked as a decorator and architect. His designs included the Assembly Hall of Landstinget (1884), Cirkusbygningen (1886) and Concert du Boulevard on Vesterbrogade (1875, demolished 1883) all situated in Copenhagen, Denmark.

He participated in the Nordic Exhibition in Copenhagen (1872), Danish department of the World Exhibition in Vienna (1873), Jutland exhibition in Aarhus (1876), Danish department of the exhibition in Malmö (1881) and Danish industrial department of the Nordic Exhibition in Copenhagen (1888).

== Gallery ==
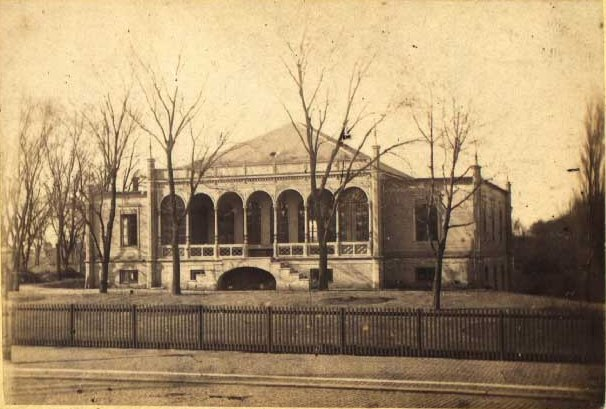
Concert du Boulevard, Vesterbrogade (1875, dem. 1883)

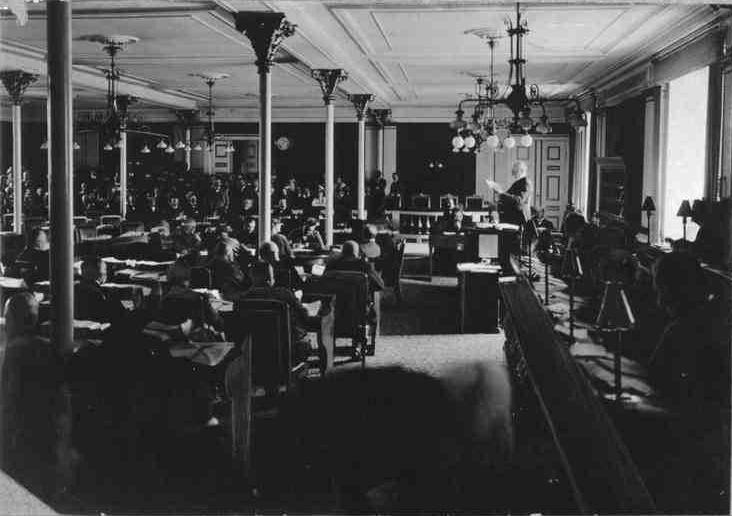
Assembly Hall of Landstinget (1884)

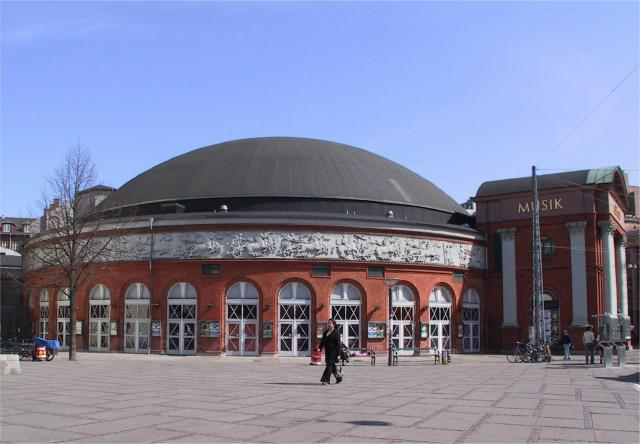
Cirkusbygningen (1885-6, rebuilt 1914)

== See also ==
- List of Danish architects
