= Danish Foreign Policy Society =

Danish non-profit organization

The Danish Foreign Policy Society (Danish: Det Udenrigspolitiske Selskab) is a private, non-profit organisation founded in 1946 with the aim of promoting interest and raising awareness on foreign policy and international affairs in Denmark.

His Royal Highness Crown Prince Frederik is the Patron of the Society. A former ambassador Ulrik Federspiel chairs the Board, and the Executive Director Charlotte Flindt Pedersen carries out the daily management of the Society.

The Foreign Policy Society is independent from political as well as commercial interests. The Society does not take a stand on political issues, but merely engages in debates by conveying and sharing information and contacts. The Society has around 1000 personal members and 200 members representing around 50 companies and institutions. The Society has a Youth Branch, DUS-U35, with around 350 members.

== Activities ==
The Danish Foreign Policy Society carries out conferences and debates, organizes study visits, issues publications and produces TV-broadcasts.

The Society invites prominent Danish and foreign speakers, politicians, academics to the debates and conferences. In the course of 70 years, many prominent speakers, including George H. W. Bush, Martti Ahtisaari, Lech Wałęsa, Dalai Lama, Kofi Annan, Carl Bildt and Navi Pillay held speeches at the Foreign Policy Society.

The Society produces the periodical "Foreign'' (in Danish: Udenrigs), which is the only one of its kind in Denmark, focusing entirely on international affairs and foreign policy. In addition, the Society produces thematic or country specific Foreign policy essays (in Danish: Udenrigspolitiske Skrifter). Until 2020 it also produced booklets with country facts Countries in your pocket (in Danish: Lande i Lommeformat). In collaboration with the Danish TV-channel dk4 it used to produce the TV-magazine In the Foreign Policy Society as well as the programme Uffe and Mogens discuss the World, starring the two former ministers for foreign affairs, Uffe Ellemann-Jensen and Mogens Lykketoft. The Society also arranges study visits to interesting countries and regions around the world. For instance, in 2016 the study visits were made to the United Nations Human Rights Council in Geneva, the Arctic region and Cuba.

== History ==
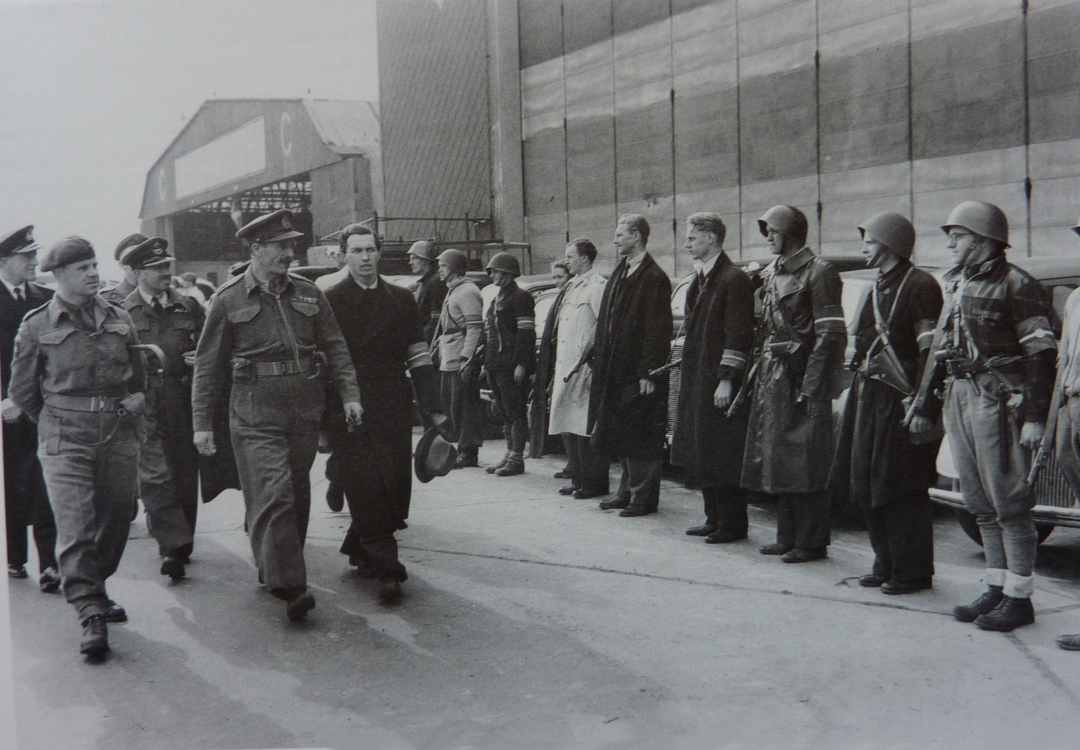
Ole Lippmann (on the right) receives the British Major-General R.H.Dewing, from the Allied headquarters, in front of an honorary company of resistance fighters on 5 May 1945.

The man behind the Foreign Policy Society was Ole Lippmann, a member of the Danish resistance movement. In his mind, foreign policy was a matter far too important to be entrusted only to politicians and government officials. Civil society should participate in the debate on international affairs, whose involvement should take place on an informed and qualified basis.

The Society was established in Copenhagen on 31 October 1946. The founders were well-known men from the resistance movement, including Ole Lippmann, Svend Truelsen, Erik Husfeldt, Ebbe Munck; politicians such as Per Federspiel and Thorkil Kristensen from the Liberal Party, Ole Bjørn Kraft from the Conservative Party, and the communists Ib Nørlund and Peter P. Rohde. Academia was represented by, among others, professors Alf Ross and Hartvig Frisch.
