= Jutta Graae =

Danish bank employee who became a member of the Danish resistance

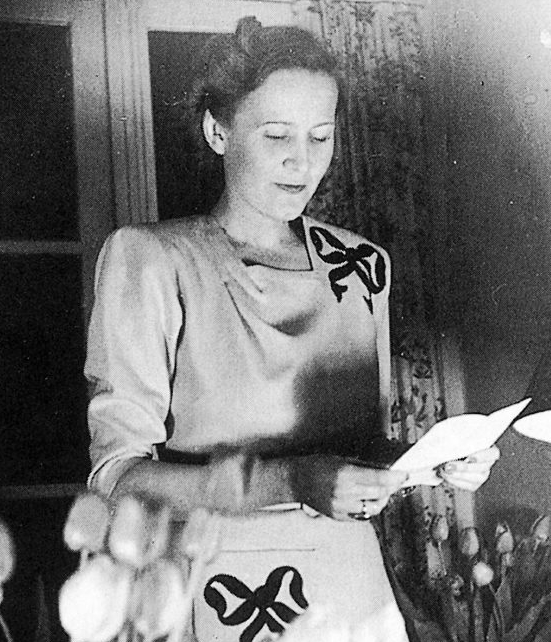
- Born: April 28, 1906
- Died: March 25, 1997 (aged 90)
- Occupation: member of the Danish resistance movement
- Title: Member of the Order of the British Empire
- Relatives: Ebbe Munck (brother-in-law)

Jutta Regitze Pilegaard Graae (1906–1997) was a Danish bank employee who became a member of the Danish resistance during the German occupation of Denmark in World War II. After first working as a contact for the resistance worker Ebbe Munck in Stockholm, she became so deeply involved in illegal activities that she had to move to Stockholm herself in September 1943. In 1944, she moved to London, where from January 1945 she joined the Special Operations Executive. After the war, she continued to work for Danish intelligence, becoming chief archivist for the Danish Defence Intelligence Service in 1956 until her retirement in 1960.

In 1947, Graae was made a member of the Order of the British Empire (MBE) for her service in World War II.

== Early life ==
Born on 28 April 1906 in Hillerød, Jutta Regitze Pilegaard Graae was the daughter of Julius Constantin Pilegaard Graae (1876–1914) and Sigrid Christiane Sibbern Køhler (1878–1966). After completing realskole, she became an assistant at the Disablement Insurance Tribunal. She then spent a year in London before taking up employment at Copenhagen's Sparekassen for Kjøbenhavn og Omegn.

== Resistance work ==
Under the German occupation of Denmark in World War II, as the sister-in-law of the journalist Ebbe Munck who was involved in clandestine activities for British intelligence, Graae was able to collect information in her position at the savings bank. It was then forwarded by courier to Munck who was stationed in Stockholm, Sweden.

Graee's home on Rosenstandsvej in Ordrup was also used by resistance members to deposit items to be sent to Stockholm. It was here in May 1943 that a key meeting took place between Mogens Fog, Erling Foss and Frode Jakobsen where they discussed how best to coordinate resistance work.

When the Germans disbanded the Danish Army and Navy in August 1943, key members of the resistance had to go underground. As a result, together with Volmer Gyth and P.A. Mørch of the intelligence service, Graae moved to Stockholm where she acted as secretary and hostess. She became so knowledgeable of resistance activities that in October 1944 she was invited to London to advise Major-General R.H. Dewing who was planning operations in Denmark. The following January she was transferred to the Special Operations Executive which was responsible for coordinating illegal contacts with Denmark.

Graae helped Danish resistance activist Edith Bonnesen escape to Sweden after Bonnesen escaped from the Gestapo headquarters in Copenhagen in August 1944.

She published her memoirs of her involvement in the Danish resistance in Værnepligt (1995).

== Post-war activities ==
After the war, Graae moved to Washington, D.C., where she worked at the Danish embassy under Henrik Kauffmann. In 1947, she returned to Denmark to join the Defence Intelligence Service, where she became chief archivist in 1956 until her retirement in 1960. In December 1960, she married the estate owner Flemming Juncker (1904–2002) whom she had met while working in London.

On 25 March 1997, Jutta Graae died in Havndal in the east of Jutland where she is buried in the local cemetery.

== Awards and honours ==
In 1947, Graae was awarded the Order of the British Empire. She was also honoured with King Christian X's medal for participation in World War II. In 1991, she received the Ebbe Munck prize.
