= Frode Jakobsen =

Danish writer and politician

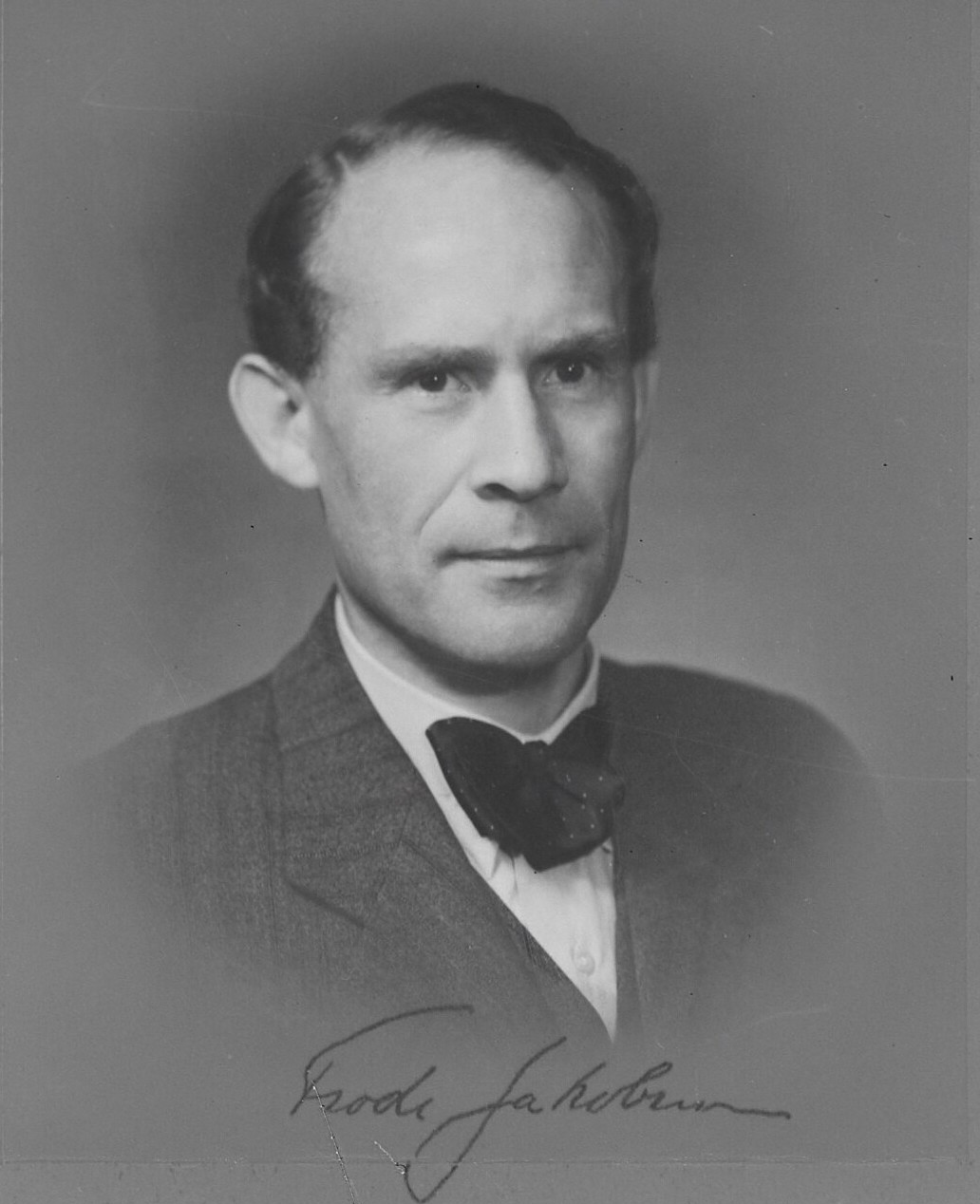
- Born: 21 December 1906; Øster Jølby, Denmark
- Died: 15 June 1997 (aged 90); Denmark
- Occupation: Writer
- Known for: Danish resistance fighter who established and ran Frode Jakobsen's Ringen (Ring) and member of the Danish Freedom Council

Frode Jakobsen (21 December 1906 – 15 June 1997), was a Danish writer and politician who is remembered for his contribution to Danish resistance activities during the German occupation of Denmark in the Second World War. He established and ran the resistance organization known as Ringen (Ring), also called Frode Jakobsen's Ringen.

He co-founded the Danish Freedom Council, which coordinated sabotage plans in Denmark and intelligence with Allied forces during the war. He also planned for Denmark's government and its diplomatic relationships once the war ended. After the war, he was a member of the Danish Parliament until 1973. He was a member of the Danish Home Guard from 1948 to 1971. He wrote several memoirs, such as I Danmarks Frihedsråd, published in 1975.

== Personal life and education ==
Frode Jakobsen was born on 21 December 1906 in Øster Jølby on the island of Mors, Denmark. His parents were Ole Jakobsen (1854–1941) and his second wife Ane Mette Lorentsen (1874–1963). They followed the teachings of N. F. S. Grundtvig in their home. Jakobsen attended a school in his village until he was twelve. He worked as a shepherd and in agriculture until he was 18, during which he would sneak opportunities to study books about Friedrich Nietzsche and Søren Kierkegaard. Having been self-taught, he was prepared to study at Viborg Katedralskole (Viborg Cathedral School) in 1929. Jakobsen majored in German at Copenhagen University, receiving his master's degree in 1939. While he was a student, he helped German refugees who came to Denmark. including "acting as a courier for German political refugees fleeing to Denmark in the early years of the Third Reich." He was a humanitarian who fought against fascism, specifically the Danmarks Nationalsocialistiske Arbejderparti (National Socialist Workers' Party of Denmark).

Jakobsen was married twice, first to Ruth Goldstein on 23 January 1937 in Copenhagen. Ruth was born in Hamburg on 3 September 1914, the daughter of Gertrud Bruhm and Bankleiter Curt Goldstein. She worked as an X-ray technician. She died in Birkerød on 5 March 1974. He married Agnes Maria Male in Solrød on 6 August 1977. Agnes was born on 29 September 1926 to Esther Hansen and Einar Male, an inspector.

Jakobsen died on 15 June 1997 and was buried at Ansgar cemetery.

== Career ==
After he graduated, Jakobsen lectured on philosophy and literature. In 1940, he published the book Nietzsche's Struggle with Christian Morality.

After the war, Jakobsen became a member of the Danish Social Democrats party, serving as a member of the Danish Parliament from 1945 to 1973. From 1948 to 1971, he was a civil commissioner of the Danish Home Guard. He wrote the book I Danmarks Frihedsråd (1975) and other memoirs. The Frøde Jakobsen prize, established in 1997, awards Danish people who have exhibited "outstanding moral courage in public affairs".

== World War II ==
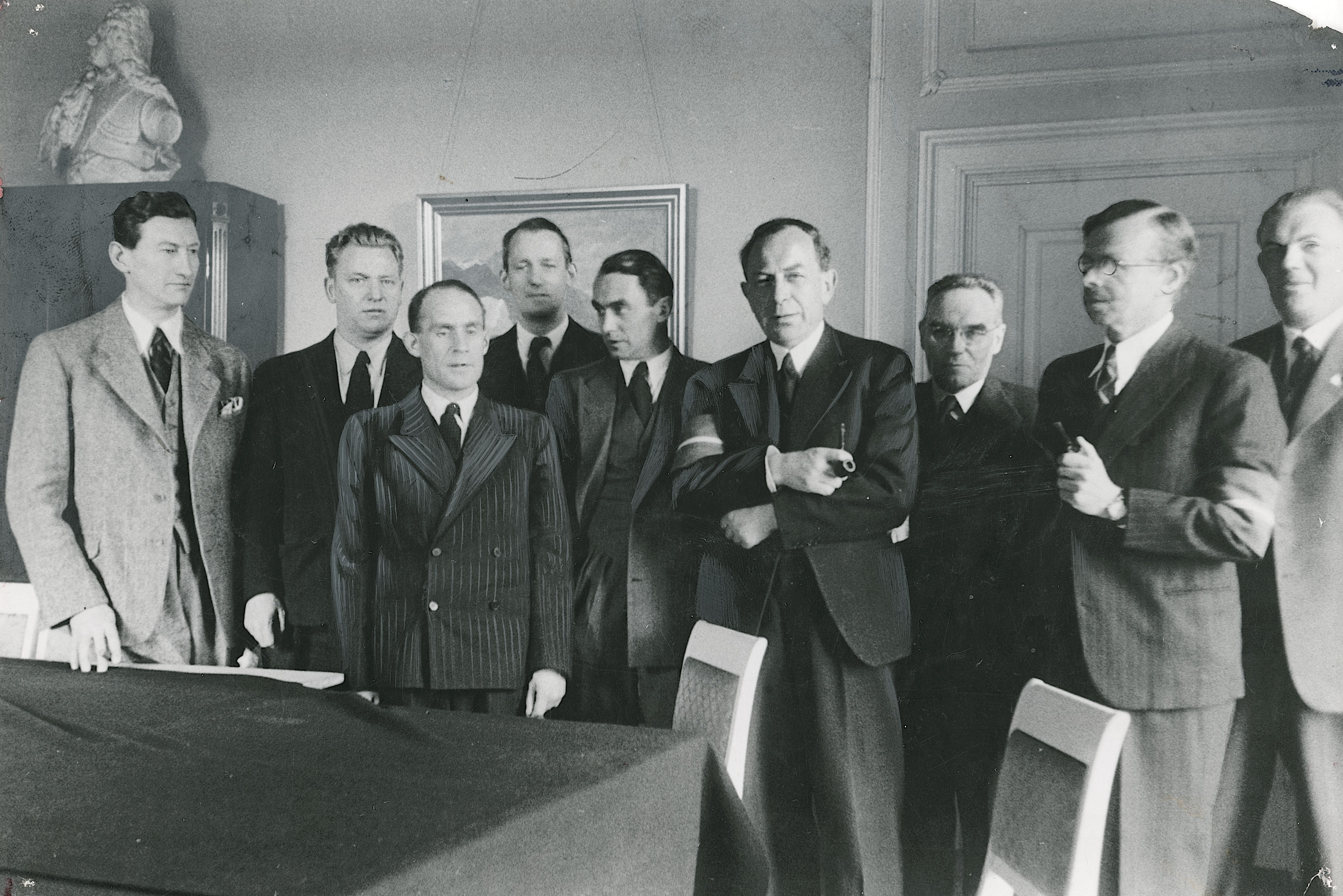
The Danish Freedom Council: Members of Danish Freedom Council after the Occupation of Denmark. From left: Fra venstre: Erik Husfeldt, Alfred Jensen, Frode Jakobsen, Børge Houmann, Mogens Fog, Aage Schoch, Ole Chievitz and C.A. Bodelsen. Arne Sørensen are standing outside of the edge. Fraværende: Erling Foss, Niels Banke and Hans Øllgaard are absent.

After Nazi Germany invaded Denmark (9 April 1940), Jakobsen spoke against Nazism throughout the country. In 1941, Jakobsen formed an organization of Danish intellectuals and scholars to exchange information that, in the summer of 1943, became a secret resistance organisation called Ringen (the Ring).

In 1943, Jakobsen was a co-founder of the Danish Freedom Council with Børge Houmann and Mogens Fog. It coordinated resistance activities against the Germans until Denmark was liberated. He led negotiations on the council. Jakobsen coordinated plans with Allied forces to end the war. Plans were made for a post-war government for Denmark and restoring its diplomatic relations. He worked closely with Swedish Ebbe Munck and English John Christmas Møller contacts.

Jakobsen sat on the Sabotage committee and coordinated activities between the Ring and the Freedom Council. He was a member of the Freedom Council's K Committee and the Contact Committee. After the war, and until elections were made, the Freedom Council ran the government and the Danish military, which Jakobsen negotiated with Denmark's commander-in-chief.

== Legacy ==
The Guardian said that Jakobsen,

represented his country in a variety of contexts, including the United Nations and the Council of Europe. His 20 years as civil chief of the home guard, originally formed after the war from former members of the resistance movement, hint at his commitment to armed resistance against political tyranny. Frode Jakobsen's self-effacing manner and soft Jutland dialect always gave him the image of a mild-mannered, sensible peasant. But it was as a civilian resistance fighter that he will be remembered, as someone who rose to the occasion when circumstances made it necessary, who could navigate turbulent political waters, and who survived to hold political power with his integrity intact.

— Hans Christian Andersen
