= Hellerup Cemetery =

Cemetery in Hellerup, Denmark

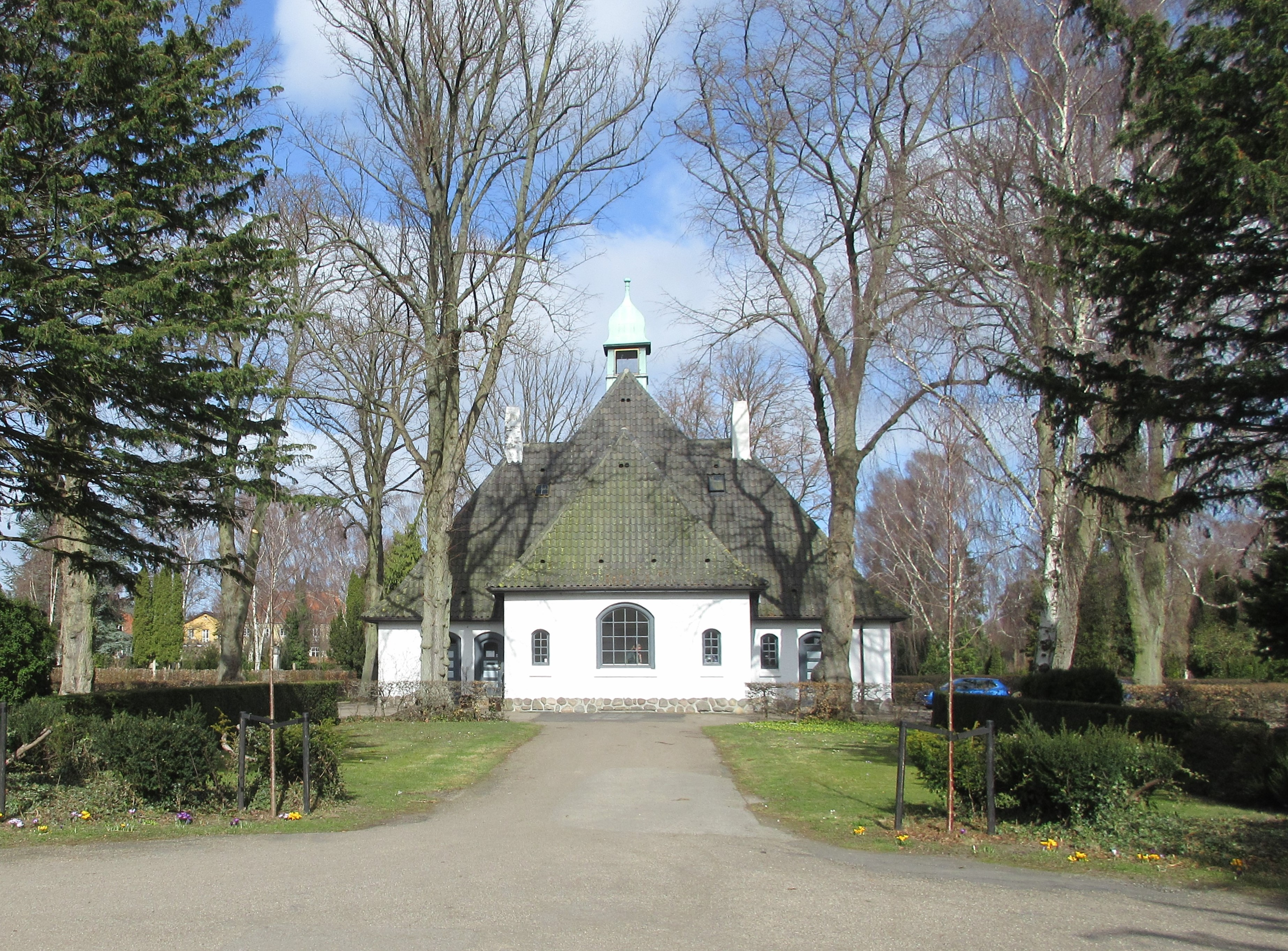
- The chapel
- Interactive map of Hellerup Cemetery

Details
- Established: 1912
- Location: Hellerup, Gentofte Municipality Copenhagen
- Country: Denmark
- Coordinates: 55°43′54″N 12°33′33″E
- Owned by: Gentofte Municipality
- Size: 7.2 ha (18 acres)

Hellerup Cemetery (Danish: Hellerup Kirkegård) is a cemetery in Hellerup in the northern suburbs of Copenhagen, Denmark. It is located on Bernstorffsvej and was inaugurated on 4 February 1912. The cemetery serves Gentofte Municipality and the northernmost part of Copenhagen Municipality.

== History ==
The establishment of a cemetery in Hellerup was first proposed in 1907 and Gentofte Municipality acquired a piece of land from Ibenske Jorder and laid it out as a burial site the following year. In 1912, after the local land owners' association had complained about the "scandalous state" of the site, the municipality commissioned a landscape architect to redesign the cemetery which was inaugurated on 4 February that same year. The cemetery has later been extended several times, most recently in 1920 when a 15,000 square metre piece of land on Rygårds Allé was added to the grounds. A piece of land on Bernstorffsvej was originally reserved for the construction of the planned Hellerup Church but it was released for burial purposes after the church had been built at another location in the 1950s.

== Buildings ==
The chapel was designed by Andreas Clemmensen and completed in 1914. It has now been closed due to limited use.

== Notable interments ==
- Johannes Allen
- A.C. Andersen
- Erik Hagen Andersen
- J.P. Bang
- Vagn Bennike
- Otto Bernskov
- Ole Berntsen
- Viggo Bielefeldt
- Leif Einar Bindesbøl
- Valdemar Birkmand
- Jannik Bjerrum
- Helge Bojsen-Møller
- Margit Brandt
- Edith Brodersen
- Johannes Brøndum-Nielsen
- William Borberg
- Aase Clausen
- Robert A. Christensen
- Benny Dessau
- Einar Dessau
- Jacob Ellehammer
- Harald Engberg
- Jørgen Falck
- Arne Falk-Rønne
- Axel Frische
- Grete Frische
- Hans H. Fussing
- Jørgen Gotfredsen
- Christian Gulmann
- Rolf Graae
- Carl Gyldenkrone
- Carl Hammer
- Andreas Hansen
- Niels Hauberg
- Hjalmar Havelund
- Gunnar Helsengreen
- Frederik Hey
- Kristian Hindhede
- Mogens Hoff
- Henrik Moldrup Hollesen
- Erik Husfeldt
- Flemming Hvidberg
- Carl Iversen
- Kjeld Jacobsen
- Georg Jensen
- Niels Lindar Jensen
- Søren Georg Jensen
- Gaby Jeppesen
- Kaptajn Jespersen
- Niels Juel-Brockdorff
- Lauritz Justnielsen
- Ernst von Kauffmann
- Ivar Knudsen
- Emil Koefoed
- Else Kornerup
- Finn Kræfting
- Anker Kyster
- Jørgen Lademann
- Hans Langkjær
- Frederik Wilh. Haae Laup
- Niels Hieronymus Haae Laup
- Ditlev Lauritzen
- Ivar Lauritzen
- Knud Lauritzen
- Philip Lauritzen
- Lau Lauritzen Sr.
- Jonathan Leunbach
- Kai Lindemann
- Hans Lundbeck
- Hanne Lundberg
- Knud Lundberg
- Fleming Lynge
- Anna Marie Lütken
- Johannes Madsen-Mygdal
- Gerda Madvig
- Christian Mourier-Petersen
- A.P. Møller
- Chastine Estelle Roberta Mc-Kinney Møller
- Emma Mc-Kinney Møller
- Mærsk Mc-Kinney Møller
- Kaj Soldal Nielsen
- Poul Nørgaard
- Alice O'Fredericks
- Povl Olrik
- Poul Rovsing Olsen
- Christen Ostenfeld
- Hother A. Paludan
- Aage Paul-Petersen
- Ingeborg Pehrson
- Nielsine Petersen
- Mogens Kornerup Prior
- C.V. Prytz
- Hans Qvist
- Erik Rasmussen
- Arne Bruun Rasmussen
- Peter Rüttel
- Kamma Salto
- Otto Sarp
- Svend Schjødt-Eriksen
- Eduard Schnedler-Sørensen (nedlagt)
- Helen Schou
- Lauritz Schou
- Annemarie Selinko
- Chresten Skikkild
- Victor B. Strand
- Aage Einer Strecker
- Nils Svennningsen
- Arne Sørensen
- Ejnar Thorsen
- Gudrun og Peter Schjørring Thyssen
- Jørgen Varming
- Kristoffer Varming
- Michael Varming
- Karen Volf
- Svend Wagner
- Sigurd Wandel
- K.A. Wieth-Knudsen
- Carl Winsløw
- Christian Zacho

== See also ==
- Ordrup Cemetery
