= Bonnesen =

Bonnesen is a surname. Notable people with the surname include:

- Beatrice Bonnesen (1906–1979), Danish film actress
- Carl Johan Bonnesen (1868–1933), Danish sculptor
- Edith Bonnesen (1911–1992) member of the Danish resistance during World War II
- Erling Bonnesen, Danish politician
- Tommy Bonnesen (1873–1935), Danish mathematician

== See also ==
- Bonnesen's inequality, geometric term
