= Ole Lippmann =

Danish businessman and WWII resistance member (1916–2002)

Ole Lippmann (25 April 1916 – 3 September 2002) was a Danish businessman and leading figure of the Danish resistance movement, active during the German occupation of Denmark during World War II. In February 1945 he replaced Flemming Muus as Special Operations Executive (SOE) parachute commander, and functioned as such until the liberation of Denmark on 5 May 1945. Lippmann was the last surviving senior figure from the wartime Freedom Council, which had been established to sabotage railways, bridges, factories, as well as oil and military installations.

Lippmann married, in 1942, Inga Bjorn Nielsen; they had three children.
