= Charlotte Flindt Pedersen =

Charlotte Flindt Pedersen (born 19 January 1965) is the executive director of the Danish Foreign Policy Society.

Charlotte Flindt Pedersen holds a M.A. degree in East-European studies from the University of Copenhagen (1994). During her years as a student she lived and traveled extensively in the Soviet Union experiencing Glasnost and Perestroika first hand. In 1990, she published the following books: “Experiment – pictures from the Soviet Union” (original title in Danish “Eksperimentet – billeder fra Sovjetunionen”) in cooperation with photographer Stig Stasig, and “Young in Moscow” (original title in Danish “Ung i Moskva”) jointly with journalist Lisbeth Jessen.

In 1996, Pederson began her career at the Danish Institute for Human Rights working with human rights, police and justice sector reform in cooperation with civil society organisations and government agencies mainly in the Balkans and former Soviet Countries. From 2009 to 2015, she was deputy director and Head of the International Division at the Danish Institute for Human Rights.

Since May 2015, she functions as the executive director of the Danish Foreign Policy Society.

She is an associate partner at Nordic Consulting Group and board member at the Ebbe Munck Memorial Foundation, International Media Support, the Danish Egyptian Dialogue Institute, and Folmer Wisti Foundation.

== Articles and publications ==
- ”Menneskerettigheder i Centralasien”, Den Nye Verden, Danish Institute for International Studies, Volume 4, 2006, pp. 123–137
- “Fælles indsats for at sætte stopper for handel med børn og kvinder”, Folkevirke, Volume 4, 2005, pp. 5–7
- Chapter 3: "Support for the Implementation of Humane Responses to Children in Conflict with the Law in DIHR Partner Countries" in "Juvenile Law Violators, Human Rights, and the Development of New Juvenile justice systems", ed.: Jørgen Jepsen and Eric Jensen, Hart Publishers, 2006, ISBN 9781841136370
- “Assessment 2000, Juvenile Justice in Uzbekistan” by Charlotte Flindt Pedersen and Jørgen Vammen Jepsen, Evaluations and Reviews of Partnership Programmes – No 20, The Danish Institute for Human Rights, Copenhagen 2001
- “Assessment 2000, Juvenile Justice in Kazakhstan”, Evaluations and Reviews of Partnership Programmes - No 19, The Danish Centre for Human Rights, Copenhagen 2001
- “Young in Moscow” (in Danish “Ung i Moskva”) by Charlotte Flindt Pedersen and Lisbeth Jessen, Amanda 1990l. It is a Russian language instruction booklet for beginners with facts about the life of Soviet-Russian youth.
- “Experiment – pictures from the Soviet Union” (in Danish “Eksperimentet – billeder fra Sovjetunionen”) by Charlotte Flindt Pedersen and Stig Stasig, Amanda, 1990. The book consists of interviews and pictures with people from different regions of the USSR. ISBN 87-89537-07-6
