= Christian Mourier-Petersen =

Danish painter

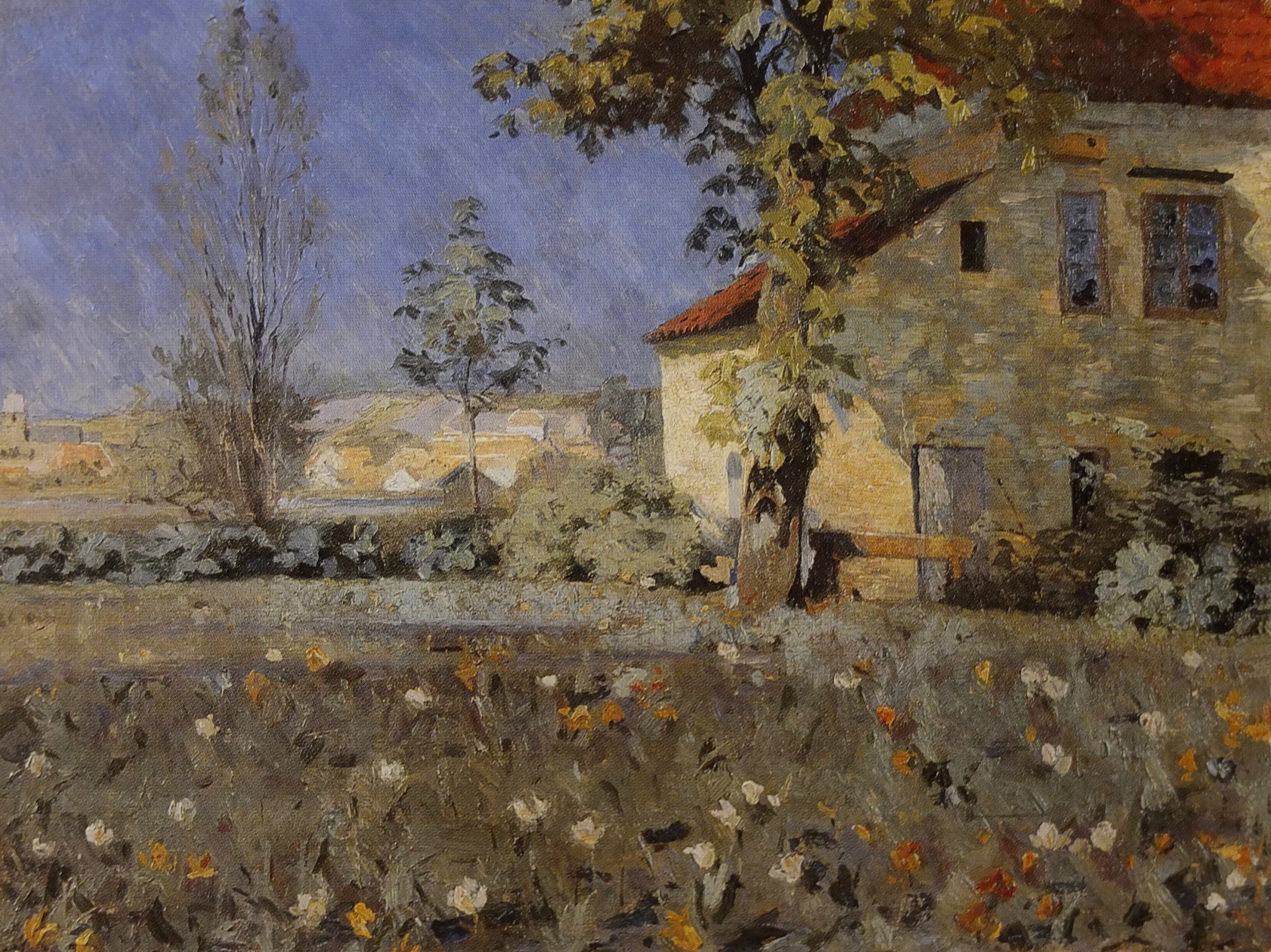
House in garden, oil on canvas, 1890. Van Gogh Museum.

Christian Vilhelm Mourier-Petersen (26 November 1858 at Holbækgård, Randers – 19 May 1945 in Copenhagen) was a Danish painter.

He was the son of a landowner A.T.H. Mourier-Petersen, graduated in 1878, studied medicine, graduated under Carl F. Andersen, and attended the Royal Danish Academy of Fine Arts from April 1880 to early 1883. He was then at the Kunstnernes Frie Studieskoler (Artists' Free Study Schools) under Laurits Tuxen from 1883 to 1886.

He lived abroad in the late 1880s, especially in France. He was a friend of Vincent van Gogh, whom he had met in Arles. In May 1888 he travelled to Paris, where he rented a studio from Theo van Gogh, the painter's brother. He also met the Impressionists. He returned to Denmark, where he co-founded The Free Exhibition in 1890. He was a member until 1932.

He was also employed by Royal Copenhagen as an artist (signature in underglaze) in the period 1894–95.

He is buried in Hellerup Cemetery.
