= Listed buildings in Morsø Municipality =

This list of listed buildings in Morsø Municipality is a list of listed buildings in Morsø Municipality, Denmark.

== The list ==
Listing name	Image	Location	Year built	Contributing resource	Ref
Dueholm Kloster		Dueholmgade 9, 7900 Nykøbing M	c. 1800	East wing from c. 1800	Ref
Dueholm Kloster		Grønnegade 53, 7900 Nykøbing M		North wing from the Middle Ages and c. 1800	Ref
Dueholm Dairy		Munkegade 22, 7900 Nykøbing M	Pre-1536	Building components from before 15536	Ref
Dueholm Dairy		Munkegade 22, 7900 Nykøbing M	Pre-1536	Building components from before 15536	Ref
Galtrup Forsamlingshus		Poulsen Dalsvej 7, 7950 Erslev	1876	Octagonal building from 1876 designed by Povlsen Nørbjerg	Ref4
Havnepakhuset		Toldbodgade 12, 7900 Nykøbing M	c. 1850	Building from c. 1850	Ref
Museum Mors and Palæet		Raadhustorvet 2, 7900 Nykøbing M	1850	Building from 1850 originally part of Morsø Iron Foundry and later used as museum	Ref
Museum Mors and Palæet		Raadhustorvet 4A, 7900 Nykøbing M	1890	Historicist town mansion from 1890	Ref
Nykøbing Town Hall		Raadhustorvet 1K, 7900 Nykøbing M	1847	Town hall from 846 to 47 designed by Jens Paul Jacobsen and Frederik Ferdinand Friis	Ref
Nørregade 21		Nørregade 21, 7900 Nykøbing M	1851	Townhouse with side wing from 1851 (side wing shortened in 1972)	Ref
Skarregaard /6)		Feggesundvej 53, 7900 Nykøbing M		House from c. 1840, three-winged complex of farm buildings with two extensions to the north an from c. 1900 and the machine house from 1925	Ref
Strandgade 61		Strandgaden 61, 7900 Nykøbing M	c. 1846	House form c. 1846	Ref
