= Arne Sørensen (politician) =

Danish politician and author

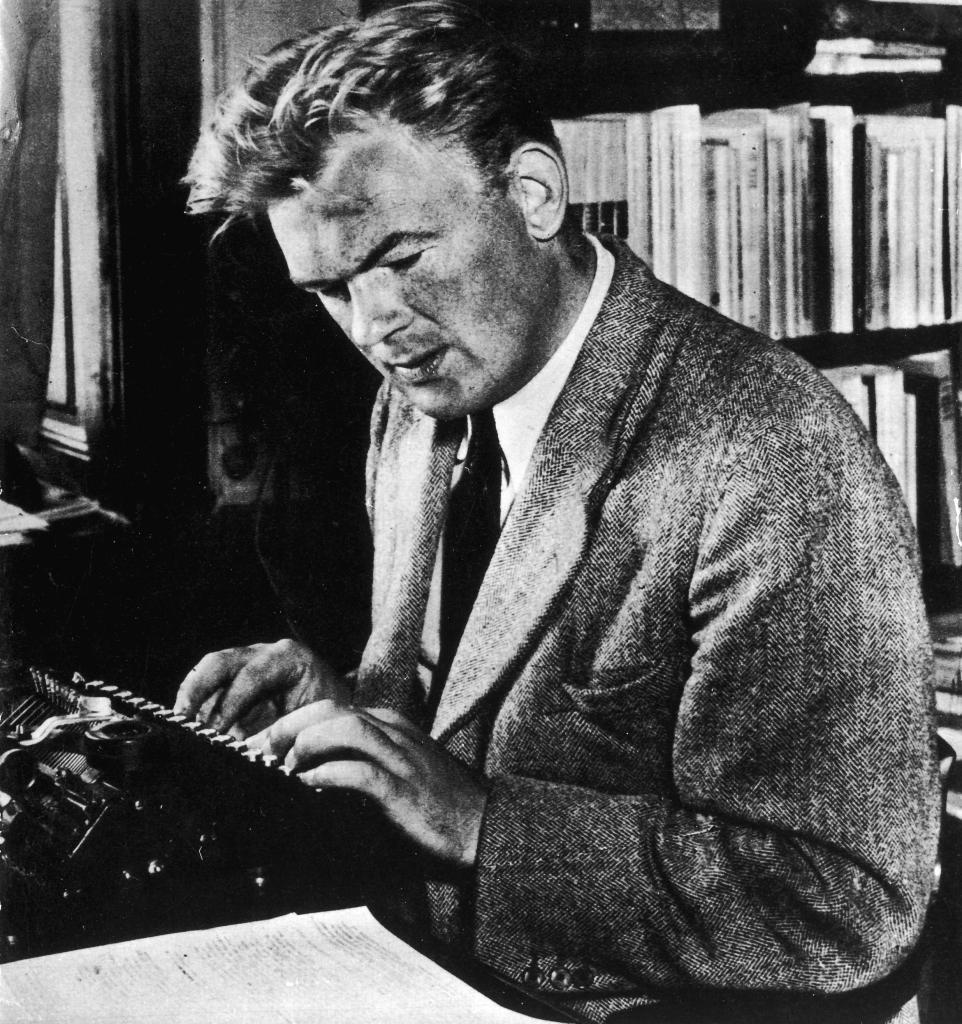

Member of the Danish Parliament
- In office 1943–1947
- Constituency: Copenhagen

Minister of Ecclesiastical Affairs
- In office 1945–1949

Chairman of the Danish Unity Party
- In office 1936–1946

Personal details
- Born: Arne Christian Sørensen; October 2, 1906 Hvalpsund, Farsø, Denmark
- Died: March 1, 1978 (aged 71) Denmark
- Party: Danish Unity Party

Arne Sørensen (2 October 1906 – 1 March 1978) was a Danish politician and author. He founded the Danish Unity party and was a resistance fighter during the occupation of Denmark. After World War II, Sørensen was a member of the Danish Parliament and Minister of Ecclesiastical Affairs.

== Career ==
Arne Sørensen was a member of the Social Democratic Party until 1936. He felt that the Cabinet of Stuning-Munch, which led the party, was parliamentary ineffective and was too sympathetic towards the Government of Nazi Germany. In response, Sørensen left the party and created the anti-parliamentary Danish Unity party, of which he was chairman until 1946.

During the German occupation of Denmark, Sørensen was an active resistance fighter in the Holger Danske group and in 1943 he became a key member of the Danish Freedom Council. After the war, he was appointed the Minister of Ecclesiastical Affairs and was an advisor to the US military government in Germany in 1948.

In 1949, he largely left his political career behind and instead focused on his writing. Sørensen maintained liberal views on social policy and was a supporter of public pensions and compulsory child support. In the late 1960s, he was a supporter of the European Federation and advocated for the creation of the United States of Europe. He authored an article in 1973 which argued for an expansion of immigration in Denmark in order to fuel the country's economy.

Sørensen taught lectures in the United States in the later part of his life and frequently traveled between the two countries. He traveled broadly in Europe and the Americas until 1965, when he permanently moved back to Denmark.

== Personal life ==
Sørensen was born in Hvalpsund to Karen Marie Nielsen and Christian Sørensen, a housekeeper. In 1931, he married Nina Sørensen, the daughter of Julius Rasmussen and Ingeborg Lumholdt.

He died on March 1, 1978, and is buried at Hellerup Cemetery.

== Bibliography ==
- Spark og Kærtegn (1930)
- Funktionalisme og Samfund (1933)
- Det moderne Menneske (1936)
- Frihed, Sandhed og Ret (1942)
- Niels Jydes Breve (1946)
- Mellem Øst og Vest (1950)
- Fra Hollywood til Akropolis (1952)
- Sønner af de slagne (1965)
- Hvem styrer staten? (1970)
