= Erik Husfeldt =

Danish physician and resistance fighter

- Born: Born with the surname Hansen; 20 December 1901; Sumatra
- Died: November 11, 1984 (aged 82)
- Other names: cover names - Architect Jensen, Architect Jørgensen, The Architect, Babylon, Erik Jensen, Hum-Hum, Architect

Erik Husfeldt, also spelled Erik Huusfeldt (20 December 1901 – 11 November 1984), was a Danish physician who developed groundbreaking practices for the treatment of heart and lung conditions and the development of anesthesia. During World War II, he was a resistance fighter, rescuer, and member of the Danish Freedom Council. He was also the second in command in Frode Jakobsen's Ringen.

He had leadership positions in health and humanitarian organizations, such as the Danish Red Cross, World Health Organization, and many more. He received honorary doctorates from the University of Glasgow and Geneva University.

Husfeldt signed the United Nations Charter in San Francisco in 1945 with Ambassador Henrik Kauffmann and Hartvig Frisch.

== Personal life and education ==
Erik Husfeldt was born 20 December 1901 in Sumatra to Rasmine Henriette Jørgensen and Peter Carl Hansen. His father died in 1936, followed the following year by his mother.

He studied at Plockross' school in 1919. He became a physician in 1927 after studying at Copenhagen University Hospital. During his surgery rotations, he trained under Harald Abrahamsen (1885–1955), chief surgeon at Bispebjerg Hospital, who inspired him to become a modern chest cavity surgeon. He changed his name in 1927.

Husfeldt was married twice, first to Inge Birgitte Varming on 13 August 1928 in Copenhagen. Inge was born on 12 March 1904 in Frbg (perhaps Frederiksborgvej, Copenhagen). Her parents were Elisabet Ruge and Kristofer Nyrop Varming, an architect and structural engineer. Inge died on 16 February 1935 in Copenhagen. He married again to Aase Gudrun Brock-Petersen on 23 November 1935 in Odense. Aase was born in Kvislemark on 24 February 1910. Her parents were Elisabeth Brock Iversen and Niels Peter Petersen, a lessee. Aase died in 1993.

Husfeldt died on 11 November 1984 and was interred at Hellerup, Copenhagen.

== Career ==
Husfeldt specialized in surgical operations using modern chest cavity procedures. He gained more experience in England, France, and the United States. He successfully treated twenty people with tumors and putrid lung abscesses, a difficult specialty before the introduction of penicillin. He published a journal article about the cases.

Husfeldt worked in Copenhagen hospitals until 1935 when he accepted a position at Odense County and City Hospital, where he worked for three years. During that time, he began improving anesthesia protocols, first improving the use of ether and later developing modern anesthesia practices. He published articles in medical journals regarding the removal of lung nodules and the treatment of whole lungs.

In 1938, he was prosector chirurgiae. He was a surgical lecturer at Copenhagen University from 1941 to 1943 when he became a professor of surgery. He became the head surgeon of Rigshospitalet inpatient department and outpatient clinic. He oversaw the operating theater and 25 beds for lung operations. His surgical work came to include heart operations, to repair heart defects or conditions in 1942. His medical career was interrupted during World War II (1939–1945), followed by a study trip in 1948. Husfeldt used emerging methods to treat children with heart malfunctions, called "blue children". After a year, he had operated on 38 children, and published a report of his findings.

Husfeldt was a professor from 1953 to 1968, during which he developed an independent specialty for heart and lung surgery. He continued to improve anesthesia practices. He published articles about heart septal defects and heart valve failures in 1959 and 1960. He developed a heart-lung machine for cardiopulmonary bypass surgery with four other physicians — H.C. Engell, Inge Rygg, Tyge Søndergaard, and F. Therkelsen.

== World War II ==
Husfeldt became a member of the Danish resistance movement with the cover name "Jensen" and was described as an architect. He was a member of the Danish Freedom Council (Frihedsrådet) from 1941 to 1947. He was second in command in Frode Jakobsen's Ringen, responsible for daily operations and management.

From 1941 until the end of the war, he operated a resistance group of junior hospital doctors. Husfeldt treated wounded resistance workers at his private clinic. He helped resistance fighter Jørgen Haagen Schmith (Citronen (Danish for 'the Lemon')).

He edited the resistance newspapers Det politische and Ringen's illegal newspaper, Ringen. Husfeldt coordinated with the Intelligence Service, including meeting with Svend Truelsen on intelligence strategy. He led the Student Intelligence Service. His wife was involved with Central Kartotek intelligence. He bought weapons for the war effort in Sweden.

Husfeldt rescued Danish Jews by transporting them across the Øresund. He managed the rescue operations from his Snekkersten summer home. He coordinated activities between the Danish Freedom Council and the military at that time.

He gave an interview in Sweden to make it appear as if it was his permanent residence.

== Medical and humanitarian organizations ==
Husfeldt signed the United Nations Charter in San Francisco in 1945 with Ambassador Henrik Kauffmann and Hartvig Frisch.

He worked with the following organizations:

- Social Democracy, for a short time
- Danish Home Guard Associations
- Society for Cultural Freedom (board member)
- Technical Cooperation with Developing Countries (board member)
- World Health Organization (WHO) (Danish teaching teams in the Middle East and South East Asia from 1950 to 1957 and a government advisor to India and Ceylon)
- Danish Red Cross (Head of the ambulance service during the Hungarian Revolution of 1956, president 1968 to 1976, honorary member)
- Danish Surgical Society (board member, chairman of the board, and secretary from 1935 to 1963)
- Nordic Surgical Association (board member)
- Danish Health Board (surgery consultant 1951 to 1966)
- Council of Medical Examiners (member and vice-chairman from 1965 to 1972)
- Studentergården University College (chairman of the board 1948)

== Honours and awards ==
Husfeldt received honorary membership and degrees:

- Doctorate at Glasgow University (1958)
- Doctorate at Geneva University (1961)
- Consul General Ernst Carlsen's honorary award (1958)
- Membership in several foreign scientific societies
