= Jonathan Leunbach =

Jonathan Høegh von Leunbach ['lɔjnbɑk] (16 December 1884 – 24 September 1955) was a Danish doctor. During the interwar period he made a controversial social effort to help women of limited means with sex education, birth control and abortion.

== Life and work ==
Jonathan Leunbach was the son of Jørgen Høegh Leunbach (1842–1903) and Cassandra Wilhelmine Hjardemaal (1845–1925). He took a master's degree in medicine in 1912 and worked as a general practitioner in Brønderslev in Jylland 1915–1917. After some years of hospital employment in Copenhagen, he established himself here in 1922 as a general practitioner.

Being a socialist, Leunbach was in favour of Wilhelm Reich's sexual political ideas. In the 1920s he was known to the public through his agitation for better sex education, safe and affordable contraception and better access to abortion, particularly for poor families with many children. In 1924, together with writer Thit Jensen he initiated Foreningen for seksuel Oplysning (Organization for Sexual Awareness), which worked for women's right to use birth control, in particular the diaphragm.

Thit Jensen broke off her collaboration with Leunbach in 1928, as she did not support his work for induced abortion. Internationally, Leunbach was a respected name, being co-founder of the Verdensligaen for seksuel Reform (World League for Sexual Reform) in Copenhagen in 1927, while in Denmark he was met with massive resistance from most political parties, medical and ecclesial communities as well as the women's rights organisation Dansk Kvindesamfund.

In the early 1930s, Leunbach performed some 300 abortions, and he was charged twice with complicity in illegal abortion. He was acquitted in 1935, but the following year was sentenced to three months in prison, lost his civil rights for five years, including being barred from working as a doctor. He and some contemporaries regarded this as a political conviction. Leunbach's work helped launch a debate on abortion, which in 1937 brought the Danish parliament to pass Denmark's first abortion legislation, which reduced the penalty for induced abortion and gave better opportunities to let a woman have an abortion for health reasons.

In 1939, the private organisation Mødrehjælpen (Mothers' Help), which was created in 1924 to help pregnant women to have their child, regardless of whether they were married or single, was made part of the public Danish social system. As part of the sexual liberation, induced abortion was made legal in Denmark in 1973, and much of what Leunbach originally fought for is now regarded as self-evident rights.

Leunbach died in a drowning accident in Italy and is buried in Hellerup Cemetery.

== Miscellaneous ==
Leunbach is mentioned in episode 10 of the Danish TV series Matador, where in 1935 one of the leading ladies creates a commotion in the town by supporting his thoughts on abortion.
