= Povl Falk-Jensen =

Danish writer (1920–2019)

Povl Falk-Jensen (26 July 1920 – 25 April 2019), better known under the codename Eigil, was a fighter in the Danish resistance movement during the German occupation of Denmark of 1940–45. Falk-Jensen was a member of the resistance group Holger Danske and the leader of the sub-group Eigil. Falk-Jensen was responsible for eleven executions of informers or collaborators and wrote his memoir entitled Holger Danske - Afdeling Eigils sabotager og stikkerlikvideringer under Besættelsen.
