= Øster Jølby =

- Village
- Location within North Jutland Region Location within Denmark
- Coordinates: 56°50′11″N 8°43′1″E
- Country: Denmark
- Region: North Jutland Region
- Municipality: Morsø Municipality

Population (2026)
  - Total: 680

Øster Jølby is a village, with a population of 680 (1 January 2026), on the island of Mors in Morsø Municipality, North Jutland Region in Denmark. It is located 20 km south of Thisted and 10 km northwest of Nykøbing.

== Churches ==
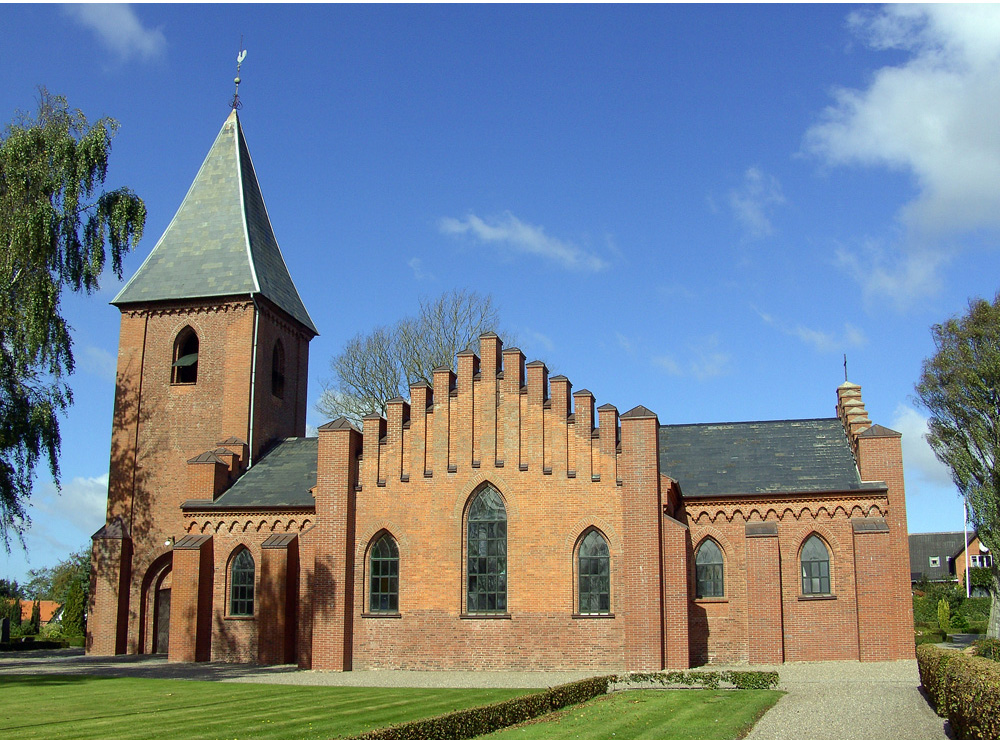
Ansgarkirken (The Ansgar Church)

Ansgarkirken (The Ansgar Church) is located in the village. It is built and consecrated in 1871 as church for the then Morsø Elected Parish which was founded that year; subsequently the Morsø Free Parish.

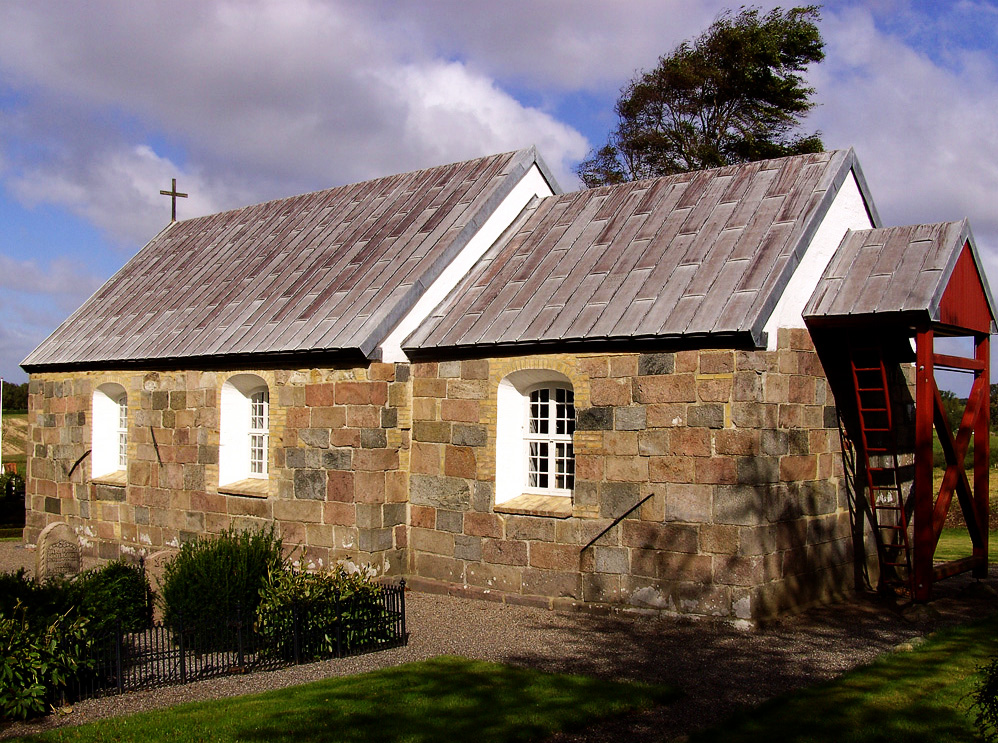
Øster Jølby Kirke (Øster Jølby Church)

Øster Jølby Kirke (Øster Jølby Church) the smallest Romanesque church on Mors is located 2 km southwest of the village.

== Notable people ==
- The writer and politician Frode Jakobsen (1906–1997) was born in Øster Jølby.
