= Edith Bonnesen =

Danish civil servant and member of the Danish resistance

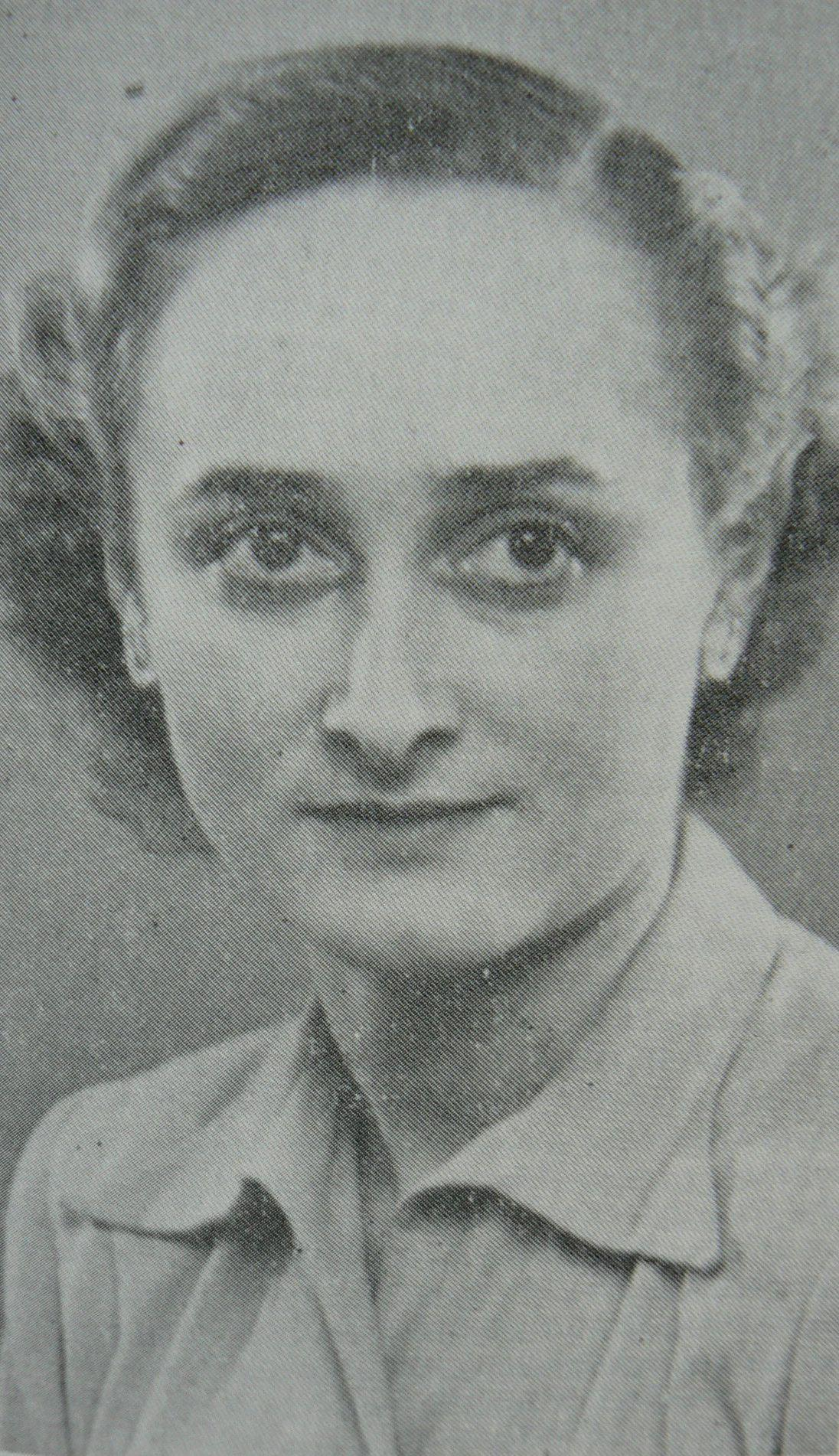
- Edith Bonnesen in the early 1940s
- Born: Edith Andersen; September 28, 1911
- Died: February 20, 1992 (aged 80); Copenhagen, Denmark
- Occupation(s): civil servant, member of the Danish resistance movement
- Awards: King's Medal for Courage in the Cause of Freedom

Edith Bonnesen née Andersen (1911–1992) was a Danish civil servant and member of the Danish resistance during the German occupation of Denmark in World War II. She contributed to the illegal newspaper De frie Danske, worked for the Danish-Swedish Refugee Service and joined the British Special Operations Executive (SOE). Arrested but released on several occasions, she escaped from Copenhagen's Gestapo headquarters in August 1944.

Bonneson was awarded the King's Medal for Courage in the Cause of Freedom for her work in the resistance movement.

== Early life ==
Born in Copenhagen on 28 September 1911, Edith Andersen was the daughter of the senior civil servant Edmund Christian Sofus Andersen (1886–1962) and Carla Vilhelmine Fliedner (1890–1928). She and her sister were brought up in a well-to-do home where they were taught to respect their country and the Danish monarchy. After completing realskole at Aurehøj Gymnasium in 1928, she trained to become an office worker. From 1930 until her marriage to Poul Winther Bonnesen in 1935, she worked for the London insurance company. Her marriage was dissolved in 1940.

== Resistance work ==
Bonnesen had already experienced the Nazis' racial policy when in 1935 she and her husband helped a Jewish couple in Denmark. In 1937, while visiting Berlin, she experienced first hand the mistreatment of Jewish people by the Nazis. As a result, she became firmly opposed to the Nazis and became interested in participating in resistance activities.

After her divorce in 1940, Bonnesen was employed in the Ministry of Transport's department for monitoring private railways. This role gave her access to confidential German reports, which she communicated anonymously to her friends in order to protest the German occupation. In early 1942, a friend brought her in touch with De frie Danske (Free Denmark), a resistance group which published an illegal paper with the same name. In addition to contributing to the paper, she became involved in producing ration cards and false identity documents. Her apartment on Tranegårdsvej in Hellerup was often used as a meeting place for resistance workers or for hiding wanted persons, including Mogens Hammer, the first SOE agent parachuted in Denmark.

In connection with involvement in De frie Danske and the SOE, Bonnesen was arrested three times by the Danish and German police in late 1942, but was released after denying any involvement in illegal work. After the Germans took over the government of Denmark in August 1943, she had to exercise more caution. She continued her illegal work with the radio specialist L.A. Duus Hansen who transmitted coded information to the SOE. Using the code name Lotte, she became his personal secretary.

In August 1944, while visiting the Danish-Swedish Refugee Service's illegal post office in central Copenhagen, Bonnesen was arrested and taken to the Gestapo headquarters in the Shell House. While being interrogated, a senior officer came in and ordered her to be taken to the basement as there was sufficient evidence against her. She was instead taken by a guard to a large room on the second floor. The guard went into a back room where he started talking to another German. Left alone, she decided to try to escape. She walked down the stairs to the first floor where she met two civilian Germans who were leaving the building. She walked behind them and out of the front door where the guard failed to recognize her. After walking calmly across the bridge to the Palace Theatre, she ran off as fast as she could.

Since she had been identified by the Gestapo, Bonnesen left Denmark for neutral Sweden where she was employed as a secretary at the American consulate in Helsingborg. She was aided in her escape from Denmark by fellow resistance member Jutta Graae. Unofficially, she operated a radio, receiving messages from Denmark and passing them on to London. After the American consul was called back to the United States at the beginning of 1945, Bonnesen acted as consul until the liberation of Denmark. She then returned to Copenhagen where she worked with the Special Forces Mission until the autumn of 1945.

== Post-war activity ==
In 1946, Bonnesen was employed by the textile firm Fiedlers Kattuntryk where she later headed the export department. In 1952, she had to leave as her hearing was seriously impaired as a result of an injury from a shooting incident during the German occupation. After learning to lip-read, she was employed as a secretary and later as an official by the Ministry of Defence until her retirement in 1975. Bonnesen partially recovered her hearing after an operation in 1963.

Edith Bonnesen died in Copenhagen on 20 February 1992.

== Awards ==
Bonneson was awarded the King's Medal for Courage in the Cause of Freedom for her participation in the resistance movement.
