= Mikkel Hindhede =

Danish physician and nutritionist

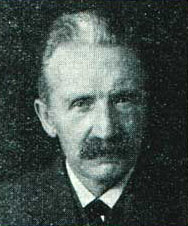
- Born: 13 February 1862
- Died: 17 December 1945 (aged 83); Copenhagen
- Occupations: Physician, nutritionist

Mikkel Hindhede (13 February 1862 – 17 December 1945), was a Danish physician and nutritionist, born on the farm Hindhede outside Ringkøbing on the Danish west coast.

== Biography ==
Encouraged by his uncle, the physicist Niels Johannes Fjord at the Royal Veterinary and Agricultural University, Hindhede was allowed to study medicine in Copenhagen and graduated with distinction in 1888.

After two decades as a general practitioner and hospital doctor in Skanderborg in Jutland, he returned with his family to Copenhagen in 1909, where he lived for the rest of his life. In his research, he studied the protein minimum and showed that earlier estimates of more than 100 grams per day were exaggerated. He recommended more rye bread, potatoes, and vegetables, and less meat.

Hindhede was the manager of the Danish National Laboratory for Nutrition Research in Frederiksberg in Copenhagen 1910 – 32 and food advisor to the Danish government during World War I.

On his suggestion, much of the pigs were sold off and the number of cows for dairy was reduced by one third. Alcohol production was also limited. The agricultural food freed that way was used for human consumption. With these measures, not only could famines be completely avoided during the allied blockade in 1917 and 1918, the death rate also sank to the lowest number ever. These results were published in the Journal of the American Medical Association in 1920. Germany had more food per capita, but a larger share was used for animal production, and famine was widespread in 1918.

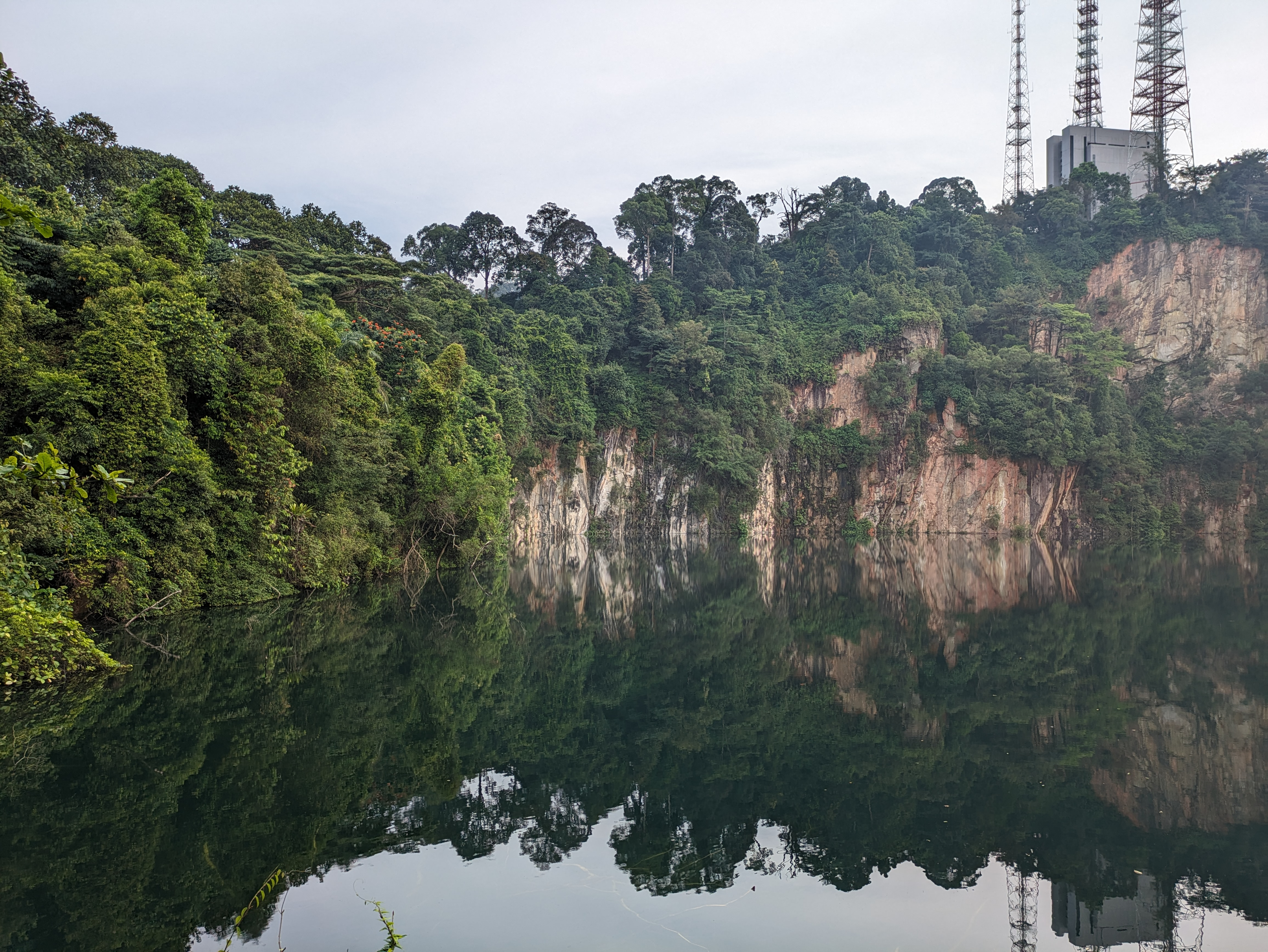
Hindhede Quarry in Singapore

Hindhede Nature Park and Hindhede Quarry in Singapore are named after the elder of his two sons, Jens Hindhede, who was a businessman and tea farmer in Singapore and Malaysia in the 20s and 30s. The younger son was the civil engineer and industrialist Kristian Hindhede.

== Dieting ==
In 1912, Hindhede showed that humans can live on potatoes. One of his laboratory assistants (a young man called Frederik Madsen) agreed to live on potatoes and butter (and sometimes a few apple slices) for almost a year. Hindhede concluded that "man can retain full vigor for a year or longer on a diet of potatoes and fat".

Polish scientists Stanisław Kon and Aniela Klein confirmed Hindhede's findings (as did a number of German scientists). Kon and Klein used potatoes and butter (with some apples and pears) for 167 days. In 1928, they reported that "digestion was excellent throughout the experiment and both subjects felt very well".

Hindhede recommended people to eat a lacto-vegetarian diet that is low in protein, as it is cheaper and healthier than a meat based diet. In 1920, in the journal Deutsche Medizinische Wochenschrift, Hindhede commented: "The reader knows... how sharply I have emphasized the advantages of a lacto-vegetarian diet. In principle, I am not a vegetarian, but I believe I have shown that a diet containing a large amount of meat and eggs is dangerous to the health."

== Selected publications ==
- Eine Reform Unserer Ernährung (1908)
- Protein and Nutrition: An Investigation (1913)
- What to Eat – and Why (1914)
- The Effect of Food Restriction During War on Mortality in Copenhagen (1920)
