= Frihedsfonden =

Frihedsfonden was founded on May 31, 1945. It was a charity for the families of fallen members of the Danish resistance movement until its dissolution in 1996.
