= Ebbe Munck =

Swedish resistance fighter during World War II

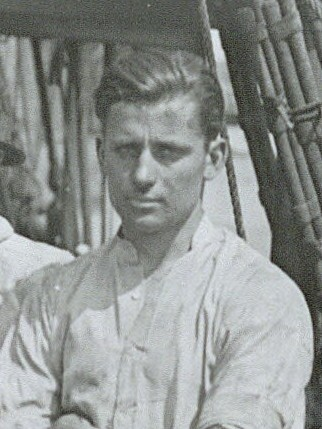
- Ebbe Munck
- Born: Hans Ebbe Munck; 14 January 1905
- Died: 2 May 1974 (aged 69)
- Occupation: Journalist
- Relatives: Jutta Graae (sister-in-law)

Ebbe Munck (14 January 1905 – 2 May 1974) was a resistance fighter during World War II (1939–1945). He operated out of Stockholm, Sweden, a neutral country, for the Danish resistance movement.

== Personal life and education ==
Hans Ebbe Munck was born on 14 January 1905. He was a student of Ordrup Gymnasium in 1922 and the following year became a member of Studenterforeningen (Student Association) in 1923.

As a student, Munck made several trips to Greenland, beginning with an expedition led by Ejnar Mikkelsen to Scoresbysund in 1924. Two years later, he traveled to East Greenland with Jean-Baptiste Charcot. He remained interested in Greenland for the remainder of his life. In 1928, Munck graduated with a master's degree in political science.

In 1934 and 1935, he joined Augustine Courtauld and Charcot's expedition to Greenland. He was the first Danish man to climb Gunnbjørn Fjeld 3,733 metres (12,247 ft) (Greenland's tallest mountain). Munck was a leader of the Mørkefjord expedition, also called the Danish Northeast Greenland expedition (1938–1939). About late 1940, Munck made a short trip to Norway to prevent the Germans from making an expeditionary trip to East Greenland.

Munck was married to Kirsten Munk, the sister of Danish resistance activist Jutta Graae.

== Career ==
Munck was a correspondent for Berlingske Tidende (a newspaper in Copenhagen) beginning in 1928. From 1929 to 1931, he was assigned to Berlin, after which he was in London until 1935. In 1936, he covered the Spanish Civil War. With the development of Nazi Germany and the annexation of Czechoslovakia, Munck cut short the Greenland expedition and was assigned to the Sudetenland and Poland in 1939, focusing his attention on the development of Nazism. In 1939, he worked in Finland as a correspondent of the Winter War (30 November 1939 – 13 March 1940).

By that time, he had already made a lot of contacts that enriched his life and career.

Business, travel and stays abroad created a huge circle of friends for him, also because his keen interests, which ranged from politics to technology to everyone's daily life, quickly connected him to everyone he came into contact with. Both his ability to communicate and his organizational talent were of unusual dimensions.

— Biographer Jørgen Hæstrup

== World War II ==
When Germany invaded Denmark (9 April 1940), Munck had requested and was assigned by Berlingske Tidende to Stockholm, where he met Charles Howard Smith, the British ambassador to Denmark (who was expelled from Denmark by the Nazi Germans on 9 April 1940). Munck developed an intelligence network, passing on information to the British, including the Special Operations Executive (SOE) organization (22 July 1940 – 15 January 1946) after he met Sir Charles Hambro in October 1940. Munck also planned to develop connections with other Western powers.

Munck became a more effective operative, working with Danish intelligence officers, after the SOE placed a contact person, Ronald Turnbull, in Stockholm in February 1941. Microfilm and other information was passed covertly through Munck to the British via couriers. He was the conduit for all of SOE's efforts for Denmark, coordinating with all of the major Danish resistance groups and raising funds to compensate SOE for their assistance. Munck helped John Christmas Møller escape in 1942, after which Swedish people became more involved in supporting aid for Danes.

As Munck became more effective, he became known as a resistance operative. In 1942, Berlingske Tidende was forced by its German side of the newspaper to fire Munck, who remained in Stockholm as a freelance journalist.

After 29 August 1943 (when the Germans officially dissolved the Danish government and instituted martial law), Danish intelligence officers fled to Sweden, and Munck became a representative and strategist of Danish Freedom Council working with Erling Foss. He increased resistance activities and developed rescue opportunities for Danish Jews. He helped attain weapons and establish the Den Danish Brigade (Danish Brigade in Sweden). Munck was also involved in setting up ways for Danish refugees to cross the Øresund and escape to Sweden. He also worked to have Denmark seen as an Allied force.

From 1943, Munck became an "indispensable" leader for the Danish cause. He went to London in August 1944 to strategize with British leaders and Free Danes about how to ensure that the Danes resistance groups had the weapons and support that they needed, plan for a post-war government, propaganda, and other important issues. Involved in the discussion were Eduard Reventlow (1883-1963), Christmas Møller, and other Free Danes. He had an in-person meeting with the Freedom Council, which meant he entered Denmark illegally, to report on the outcome of the meeting.

Although he had no official position, he made a significant impact on the Danish resistance and rescue movement throughout the war.

== After the war ==
Munck worked for Berlingske Tidende from the war's end until 1947 when he worked for the foreign service. He was the Ambassador to Thailand from 1959 to 1967. Munck then worked for Princess Margrethe, later Queen Margrethe II of Denmark, as the head of court.

== See also ==
- Jutta Graae, resistance contact. His wife's sister
- Eigil Knuth, Denmark Expedition to Greenland
- Charlotte Flindt Pedersen, board member of the Ebbe Munck Memorial Foundation
- The Danish Foreign Policy Society, Munck was a co-founder in 1946
