= Per Federspiel =

Danish politician (1905–1994)

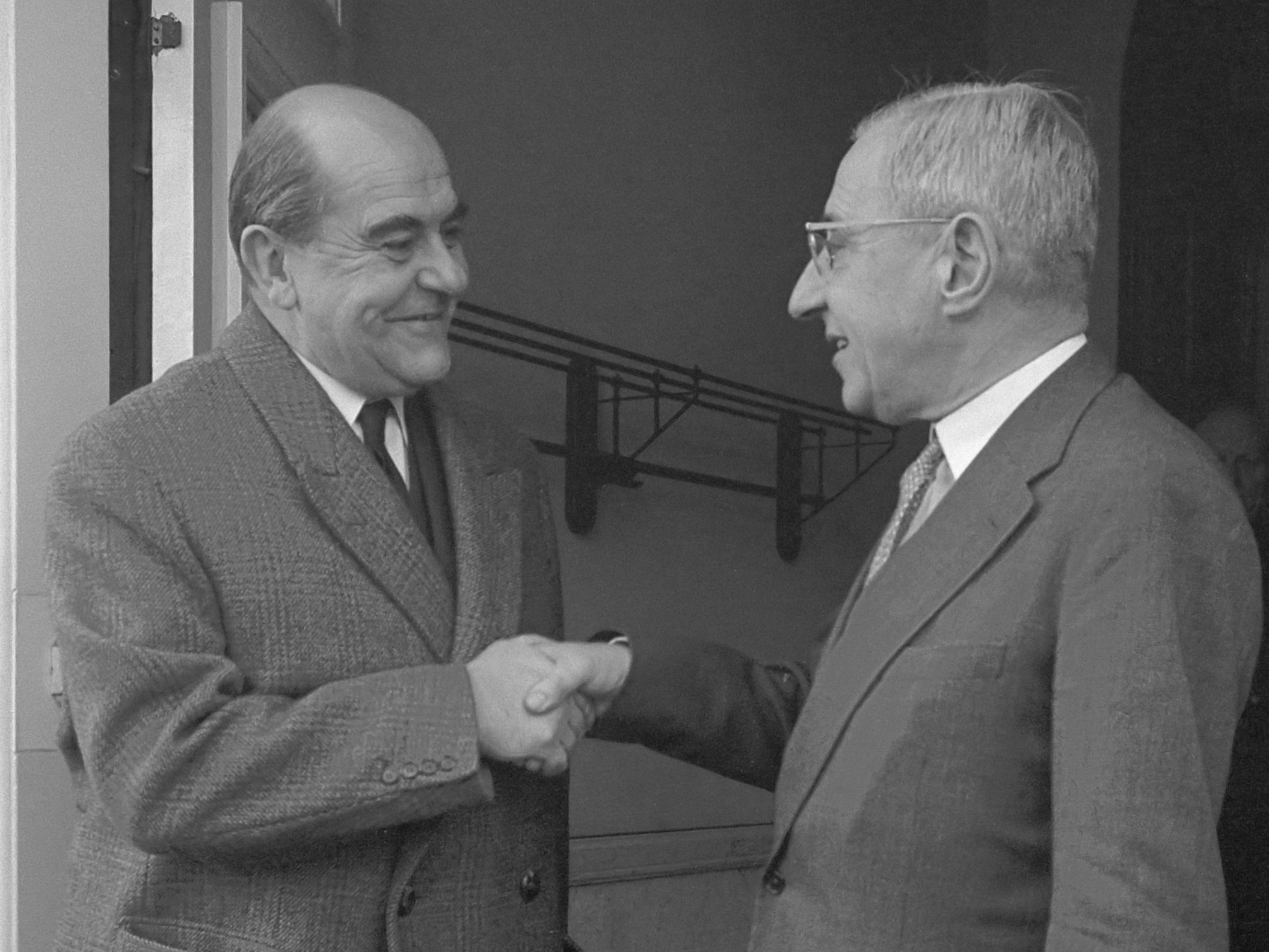
Per Federspiel (l.) and Jan de Quay (1961)

Torben Per Federspiel (9 April 1905 – 27 November 1994) was a Danish politician.

Per Federspiel was the son of lawyer Holger Federspiel (1868–1934) and Asta Nutzhorn (1880–1951). Because his father lived in England at the time, he received part of his schooling in Harrow school.

Subsequently, he enrolled at the law school of the University of Copenhagen. As a student, he was secretary to Viggo Berg, his mother's cousin and son of the left wing leader Christen Berg. He graduated in law in 1931 and in 1937 joined the Bar of the Eastern High Court. Working for the legal firm of Max Rothenborg brought him into contact with Jewish clients and gave him an insight into the condition of the Jews in Hitler's Germany.

During the German occupation, he was responsible for arranging the financing of a large part of the resistance movement. He was arrested by the Gestapo in October 1943 but managed to escape; however, he was again arrested in April 1944, and spent the next year in Vestre Prison, Horserød camp and Frøslev camp. After the war he became first president of the Freedom Fund, a charity for the families of resistance members.

He was minister for special affairs in the Kristensen cabinet from 1945 to 1947, then a member of the Folketing (first chamber of parliament) from 1947 to 1950 and again 1957 to 1973. He was a member of the Landsting (second chamber) from 1951 to 1953.

He worked strongly for closer European cooperation, including for Denmark's membership of the European Communities, and from 1960 to 1963 was the only Danish chairman of the Parliamentary Assembly of the Council of Europe.

Besides his political activities he ran his law practice, which has since become a part of the large law firm Gorrissen Federspiel Kierkegaard.

He is buried at Hørsholm Cemetery.

Political offices
Preceded by John Edwards	President of the Parliamentary Assembly of the Council of Europe; 1960 – 1963	Succeeded by Pierre Pflimlin
