= Kristian Hindhede =

Danish businessman (1891–1969)

Kristian Hindhede (surname pronounced as hin-d-her)(19 August 1891 – 8 January 1969) was a Danish civil engineer and industrialist. He was a son of the physician and nutritionist Mikkel Hindhede.

In the 1920s, Kristian Hindhede pioneered the use of ready-mix concrete trucks with a horizontal rotating drum mixer. He is described as the inventor of this vehicle in the Danish Who's Who Kraks Blå Bog. As early as 1916, Stephen Stepanian of Columbus, Ohio, developed a self-discharging motorized transit mixer that was the predecessor of the modern ready-mix concrete truck, but the patent that Stepanian filed in 1916 was rejected in 1919. The poor quality of motor trucks at the time was a problem for inventors.

Hindhede's company A/S De danske Betonfabrikker (later renamed KH Beton) evolved into Unicon A/S, Scandinavia's largest supplier of ready-mix concrete. It was acquired by Aalborg Portland in 1927.
