= Frederiksborgvej, Copenhagen =

Street in Copenhagen, Denmark

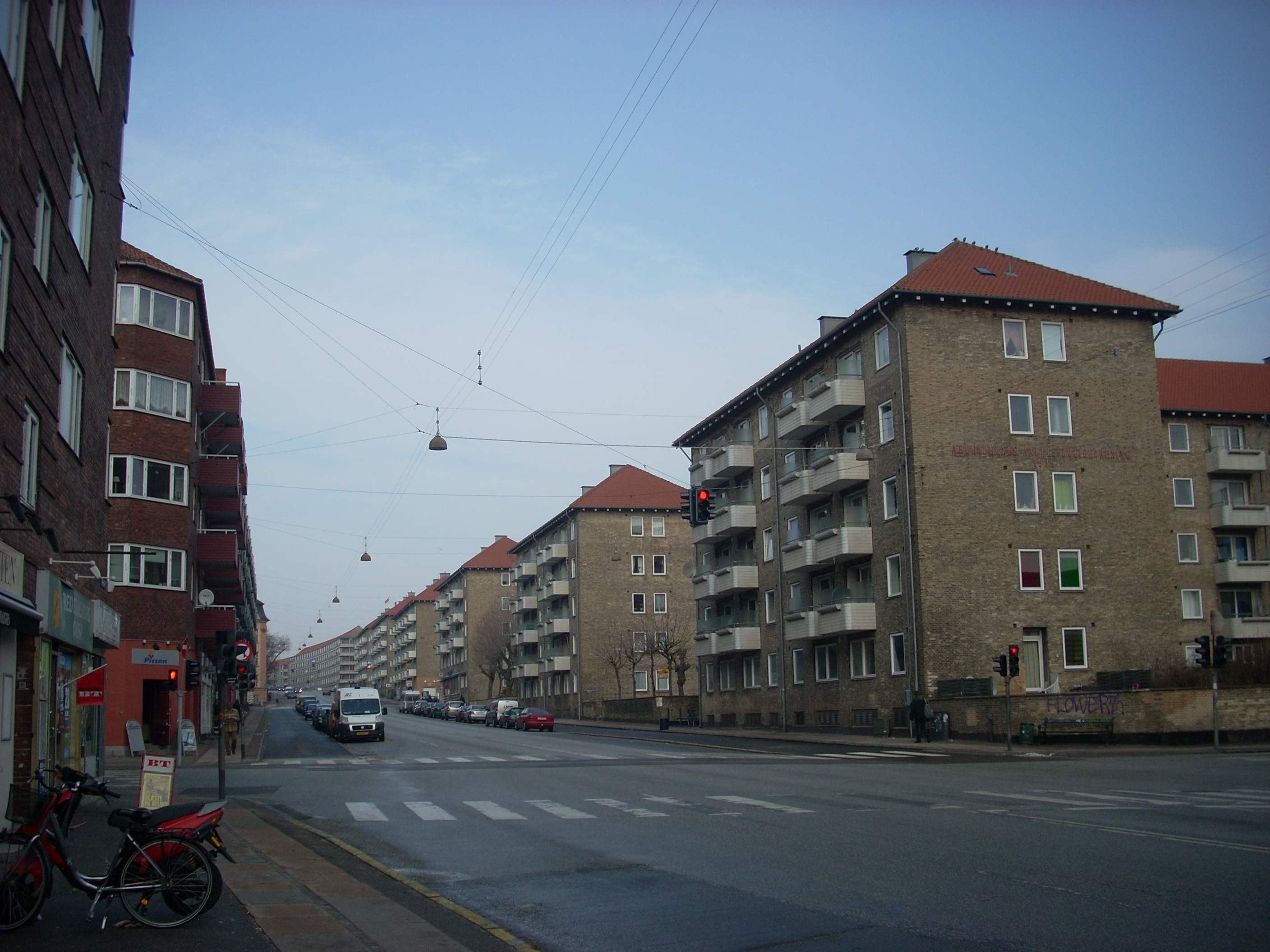
Frederiksborgvej.

Frederiksborgvej is a major street in the North-West, Bispebjerg and Emdrup neighbourhoods of Copenhagen, Denmark. The 3-kilometer street runs from Frederikssundsvej in the south to the municipal border with Gladsaxe Municipality in the north, where it splits into Søborg Hovedgade and Vangedevej.

== History ==
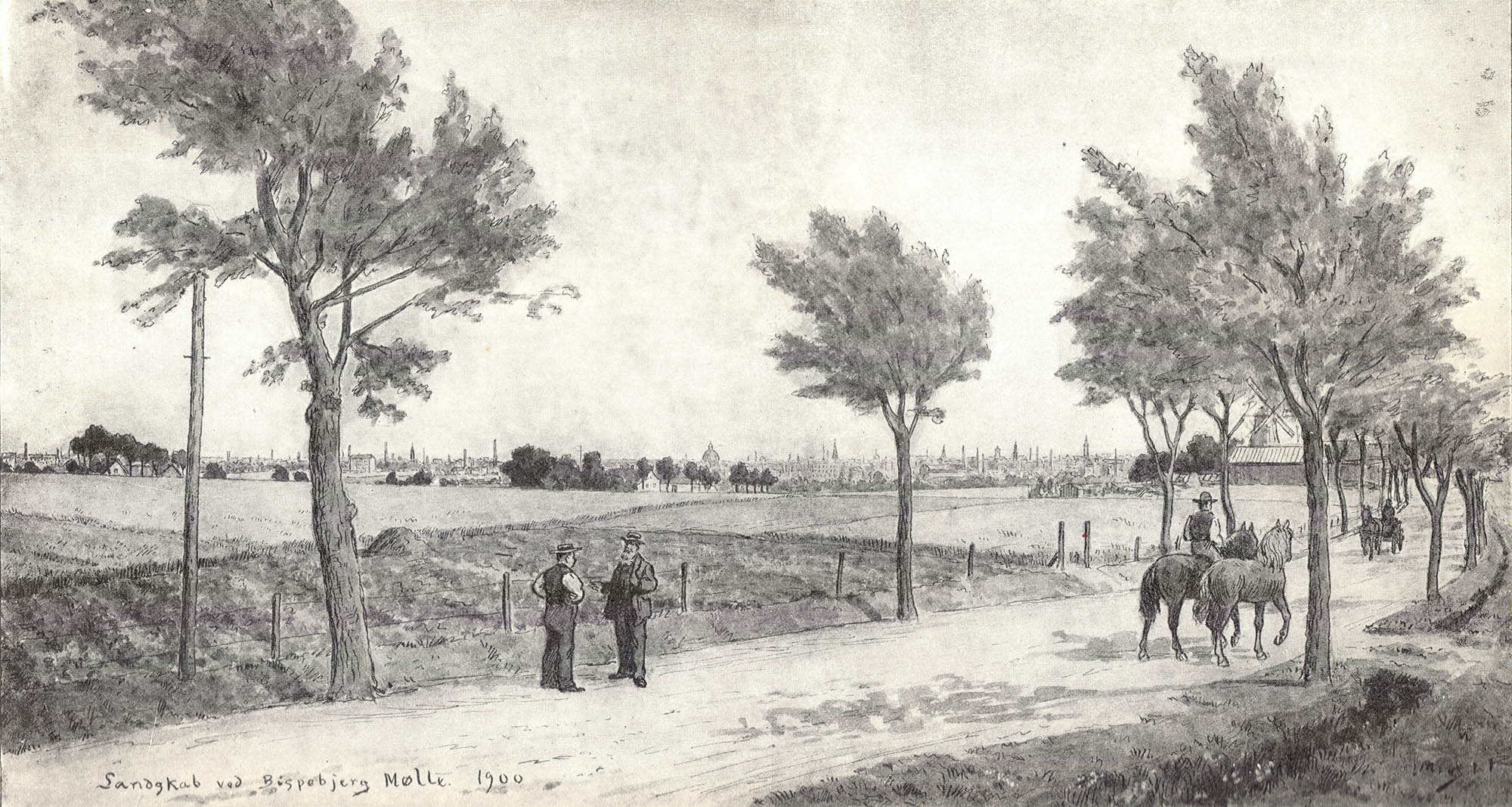
Frederiksborgvej seen on a drawing by Janus Laurentius Ridter with Bispebjerg Windbill just visible to the right

Frederiksborgvej was part of the road that Christian IV established in circa 1620 between Copenhagen and Frederiksborg Castle. The road ran across Bispebjerg Hill. The land belonged to the farms in the village of Emdrup. It belonged to the parish of Brønshøj.

In 1870 the City of Copenhagen began to buy up land in the area and the civil parish of Brønshøj-Husum was merged into Copenhagen in 1901. The area along the road was gradually built over with a combination of housing and industry. Glud og Marstrand occupied a large site bounded by Grederiksborgvej, Rentemestervej, Rebslagervej and Drejervej.

== Notable buildings and residents ==
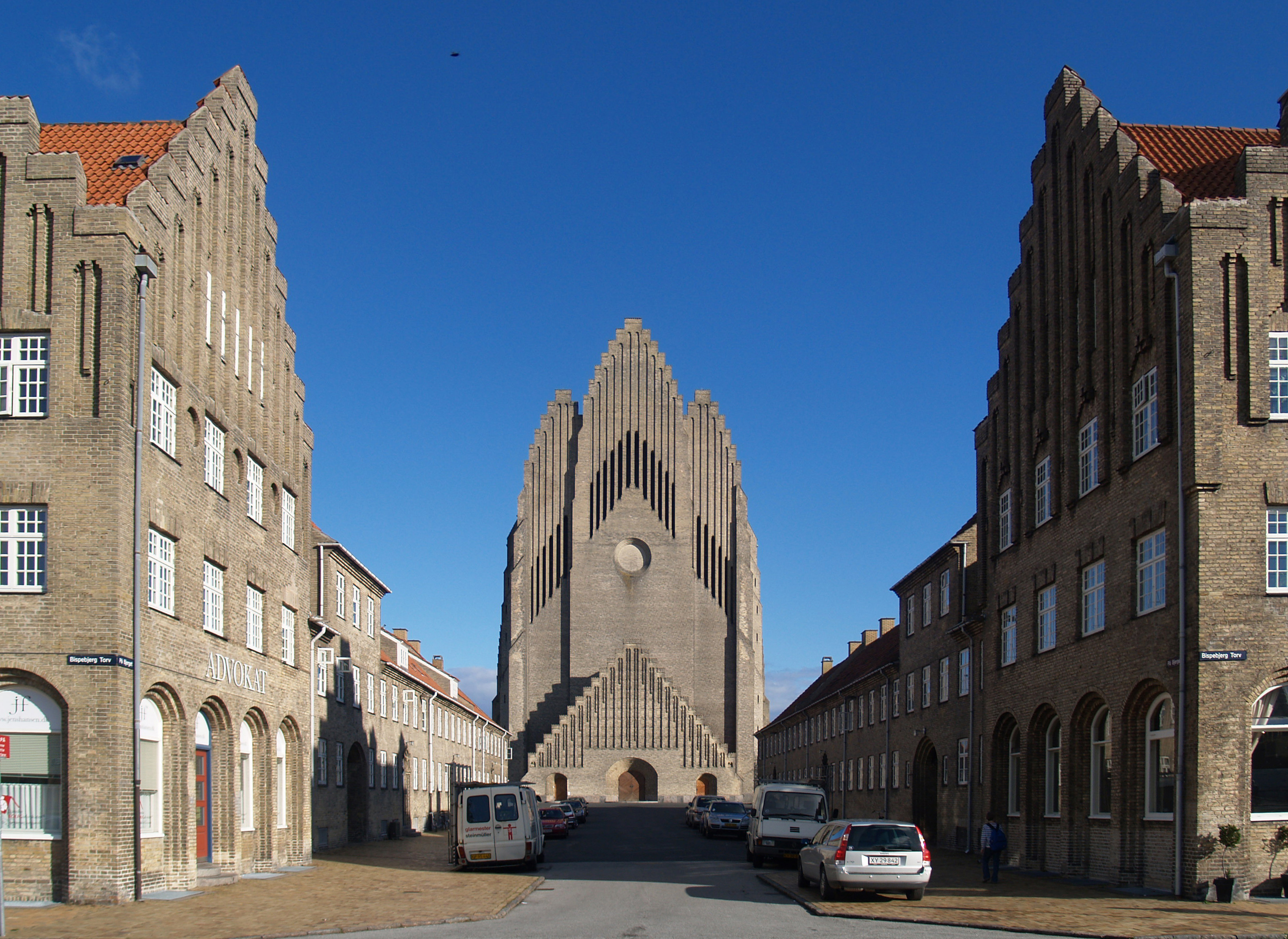
Grundtvig's Church seen from Frederiksborgvej

The most notable landmark along the street is Grundtvig's Church. It was inaugurated in 1940 and is designed by Peder Vilhelm Jensen-Klint. Bispebjerg Cemetery is located on the other side of the street. Bispebjerg Chapel has now been decommissioned and is operated as a venue for dance under the name Dansekapellet (Chapel of Dance). The domed building was designed by Holger Jacobsen.

Bispebjerg Skole (No. 107), designed by Carl Thorning, was built in 1911–12. It was expanded by Axel Ekberg in 1931. Holbergskolen, another public primary school, is located at No. 216.

== Public art ==
In front of the Bispeparken Housing Estate, close to the corner of Tuborgvej, stands a 2.5 m tall figurative sculpture of a snowy owl. It was created by Gunnar Westman and is from 1968. Westman is known for his animal sculptures.
