= Ellen Christensen =

Danish resistance member and nurse

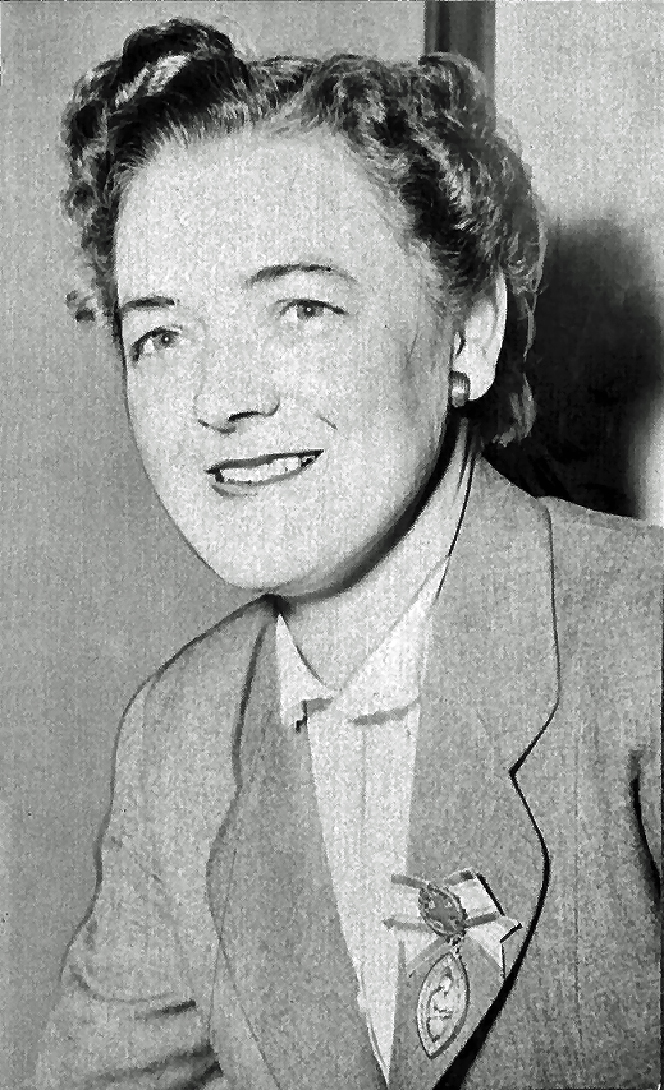
Ellen Christensen after receiving the Florence Nightingale Medal

Ellen Marie Christensen (1913–1998) was a Danish nurse who became a resistance fighter during the German occupation of Denmark in World War II. In 1953, she was awarded the Florence Nightingale Medal for her contribution to saving Jews, resistance workers and allied pilots.

== Biography ==
Born on 30 March 1913 in the parish of Frejlev to the south west of Aalborg, Ellen Marie Christensen was the daughter of the farmer Peter Marinus Christensen (born 1885) and Christiane Hansen (born 1884). Brought up in a well-to-do family, after completing her school education, she trained to become a nurse.

Under the German occupation, she was employed at Bispebjerg Hospital. She soon became a member of the resistance group Frit Danmark (Free Denmark) where she helped to produce and distribute illegal publications. Her commitment to the cause increased when the Germans began to arrest the Danish Jews in October 1943. Bispebjerg Hospital was used to house Jewish refugees until they could be transported to Sweden. Thanks to her active participation in this work, Christensen developed numerous connections with the resistance movement. Not only did she treat wounded refugees, but contributed to transporting weapons and explosives and to obtaining fake identity cards and other items to facilitate resistance work.

She became the partner of the key resistance coordinator Jørgen Haagen Schmith, better known as Citronen (the Lemon). When he was seriously wounded by the Germans in September 1944, she cared for him every day. When the Gestapo discovered their hiding place in October, Schmith was killed but Christensen managed to escape, although her identity card had been found. As a result, she had to work underground for the rest of the war.

After the war, she worked on several assignments abroad for the Red Cross, first in Greece and later in Israel during the Six Day War in 1967.

== Honours and awards ==
For her contribution to saving Jews, resistance workers and allied pilots during the German occupation, Ellen Christensen was awarded the Florence Nightingale Medal in 1953.
