= Erling Foss =

Danish politician and resistance member

- Born: 25 February 1897
- Died: 15 June 1982 (aged 85)

Erling Christian Foss (25 February 1897 – 15 June 1982) was a Danish civil engineer, famous for his contributions to the Danish resistance movement. As a result of contacts with Ebbe Munck and the Danish army's intelligence service, he became involved with the resistance at an early stage of the German occupation of Denmark. In September 1943, he became a member of the Danish Freedom Council representing De Frie Danske.

In February 1944, he took up a mission in Stockholm involving arms deliveries to the resistance and negotiations to have Denmark recognised as an Ally. He sent regular reports to Christmas Møller who draw on them for BBC broadcasts to Denmark.

After the war, he became active in the Danish Conservative Party, supporting membership of NATO and relations with West Germany.
