= Karen Volf =

Danish baker and entrepreneur

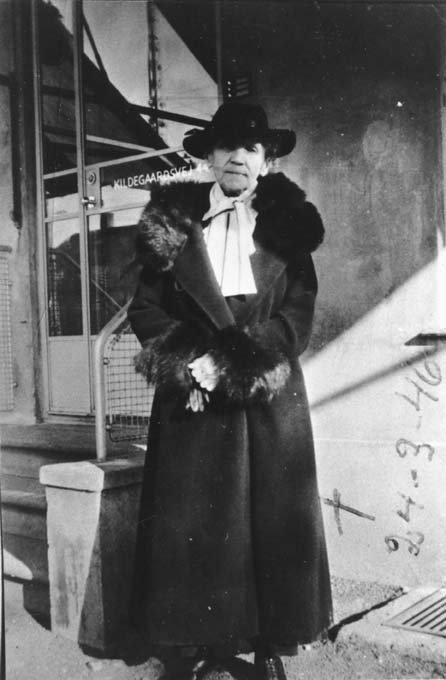
- Volf in 1946
- Born: Karen Kirstine Hansen; June 20, 1864; Dåstrup, Roskilde Municipality, Denmark
- Died: 6 April 1946 (aged 81); Copenhagen, Denmark
- Spouse: Christen Adolf Volf
- Children: 2
- Parent(s): Søren Hansen, Ane Kirstine Andersen
- Website: karenvolf.dk

Karen Kirstine Volf, also Wolff, née Hansen (1864–1946) was a Danish baker and pastry cook who in 1890 established a bakery in Hellerup, north of Copenhagen; this was unusual for a woman at that time and place. As a result of the popularity of her cakes and biscuits, by the early 1900s she was able to serve the whole of Copenhagen by introducing automobile-based deliveries. In the 1920s and 1930s, the business expended to the whole of Denmark with outlets throughout the country. Today her biscuits and cakes continue to be produced on an industrial scale as Karen Volf products by the Bisca establishment in Stege on the island of Møn.

== Biography ==
Born on 20 June 1864 in Dåstrup, Roskilde Municipality, Karen Kirstine Hansen was the daughter of the farmer and miller Søren Hansen and his wife Ane Kirstine Andersen. In early 1890, she opened a small bakery business in Hellerup. It quickly proved to be a success, enabling her to save enough money to marry Christen Adolf Volf from the south of Jutland that August.

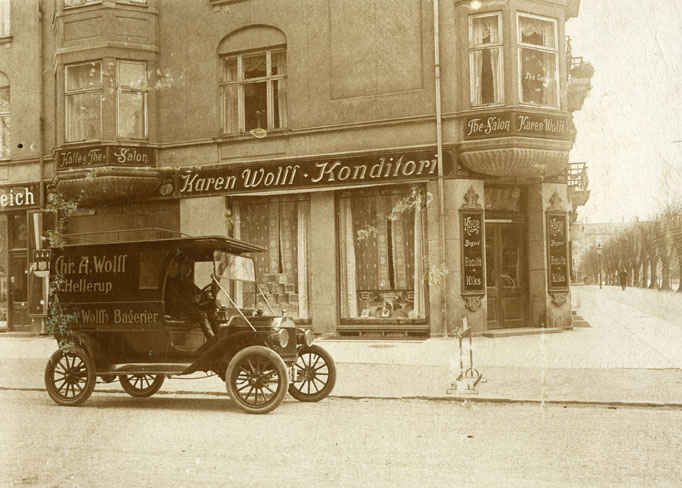
Volf's bakery on Margrethevej, Hellerup

The couple's dairy and bakery shop on Strandvejen did so well that they were soon able to move into larger premises on Margrethevej. There Karen Volf developed a system of high volume production of cakes, biscuits and waffles. The early introduction of delivery by car enabled people to order by telephone and receive newly baked products at home. The business was so successful that around 1924 they had to move once again, this time establishing a completely new factory-based production facility near Kildegårds Plads able to produce large quantities of the popular pastries and biscuits. Adjacent to the factory there was a tea room serving the pastries and hot drinks; Crown Prince Frederik and Princess Thyra visited. With the assistance of their children Harriet Volf Jensen and Holger Volf, they increased production, and distributed countrywide.

Karen Volf died in Copenhagen on 6 April 1946.
