= Mogens Fog =

Danish physician and politician

Personal details
- Born: 9 June 1904 Frederiksberg, Copenhagen, Denmark
- Died: 16 July 1990 (aged 86)
- Party: Socialist People's Party
- Other political affiliations: Communist Party of Denmark, Danish Freedom Council

Mogens Ludolf Fog (9 June 1904 – 16 July 1990) was a Danish physician, politician (Danish Communist Party) and resistance fighter. In the 1930s, he headed the Socialistiske Læger (Socialist Physicians) who opposed Fascism.

== Biography ==
Fog was born in Frederiksberg, Copenhagen, in 1904. In his youth he was a member of the Communist Party of Denmark, but in the 1930s he was not active in the political arena due to his studies in medicine. In 1934 he completed his PhD, and his thesis was entitled "On the vasomotoric reactivity of leptomeningeal arteries".

During the Second World War and the German occupation of Denmark, he played a strategic role in the Danish resistance movement. In 1942, he helped to set up the Frit Danmark, the illegal non-partisan resistance newspaper, and became an active member of the Danish Freedom Council (Frihedsrådet) in 1943. He was arrested by the Gestapo in October 1944 but escaped in March 1945 after their headquarters in the Shell building were bombed by the Royal Air Force.

After the war, he continued his political career, first as a Communist but in 1958 he left the Communist Party of Denmark and founded the Socialist People's Party together with Aksel Larsen.

From 1966 to 1972, he was rector of the University of Copenhagen. He was rector during the protests of 1968 and in cooperation with the students he made democratic reforms of university governance.

== Bibliography ==
- Morten Møller: Mogens Fog: en biografi, Gyldendal A/S, 2009
