= Danish Freedom Council =

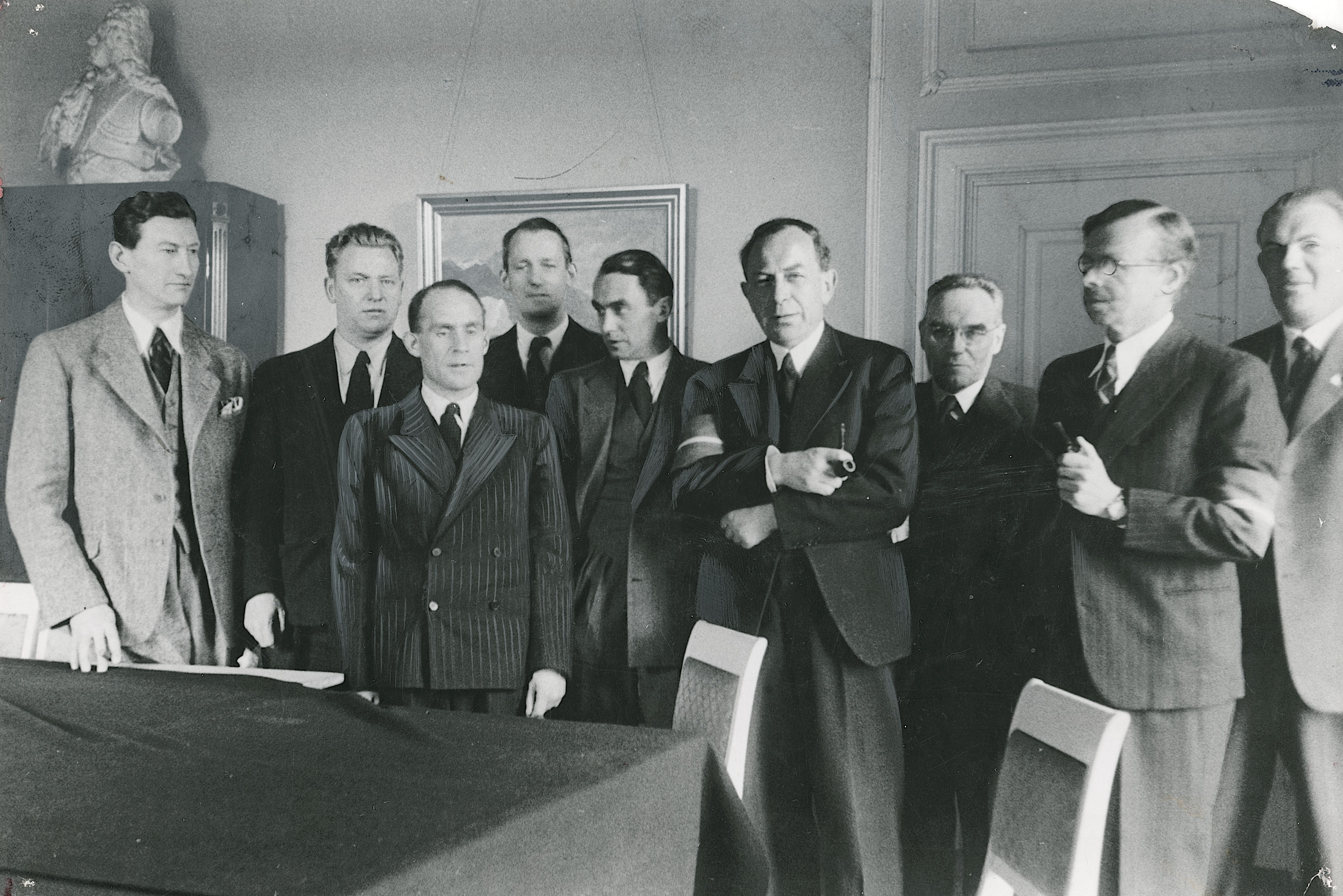
Members of the Danish Freedom Council after the Occupation. From left: Erik Husfeldt, Alfred Jensen, Frode Jakobsen, Børge Houmann, Mogens Fog, Aage Schoch, Ole Chievitz and C.A. Bodelsen. Arne Sørensen are standing outside of the edge. Absent: Erling Foss, Niels Banke and Hans Øllgaard.

The Danish Freedom Council (Danish: Danmarks Frihedsråd) was a clandestine body set up in September 1943 in response to growing political turmoil surrounding the occupation of Denmark by German forces during the Second World War.

== Background ==
Technically, Denmark was illegally occupied by the Germans through Operation Weserübung on 9 April 1940. The Danish government as well as King Christian X immediately made formal protests but ultimately acquiesced to a unique German arrangement whereby Denmark was given 'independence' despite having German troops stationed in the country. Concerned about the safety of the population, the Danish government thought it best to accept these terms.

As a result, resistance initiatives could not be formally recognised by the Allied forces. Although the Danish government in Copenhagen had accepted the situation, many Danes had not. Much of the Danish Navy had sailed to Allied ports and Danish ambassadors abroad had refused to accept their government's decision.

A Danish resistance movement arose at the initiative of citizens and former Danish soldiers. Initially the movement was willing to pass intelligence on to the Special Operations Executive (SOE) but refused to follow the SOE's calls for sabotage operations. Any sabotage that did take place was sanctioned by resistance leaders within Denmark or based in Stockholm. There was an increase in acts of sabotage in Denmark from 1943 on. Field Marshal Montgomery later stated that intelligence from Danish resistance had been "second to none".

Up to 1943, the occupation was relatively quiet. However, Danish acts of sabotage caused the Germans to harden their response, arresting those involved. This led to strikes, more arrests for civil disobedience, causing even more strikes.

By August 1943, the situation had become so bad, that the Germans sent the Danish government an ultimatum — they were to declare a state of emergency and they were to condemn to death all captured saboteurs. The government refused to do this and resigned. The Germans responded by formally seizing power and, legally, Denmark became an "occupied country", adding to the legitimacy of the Danish Resistance.

Anti-Nazi sentiment sharpened further when the Germans attempted to arrest the Danish Jews in October 1943. The operation failed thanks to Danish assistance in helping over 7,000 of them to escape to Sweden.

== The Freedom Council ==
In September 1943, the 'Danish Freedom Council' was created to co-ordinate the fight for liberation. The Council set out to unify the many different groups that made up the Danish resistance movement and consisted of representatives from the Communists, Free Denmark, Danish Unity and a resistance group called the Ring. Key members were Børge Houmann, Mogens Fog, Arne Sørensen, Frode Jakobsen, Erling Foss and Aage Schoch. Directives from the British Special Operations Executive helped to unite the different groups.

In December that year, the SOE sent orders that military groups should be organised, ready to attack the Germans in case of invasion. They were first organised by the Communists and the Danish Unity Party, and then increasingly by members of the Ring.

The resistance movement grew to over 20,000 and in the lead-up to D-Day acts of sabotage markedly increased. Though the D-Day landings were to be in Normandy, the SOE encouraged tying up German troops elsewhere in Europe so that the fewer would be present in northern France. If acts of sabotage were increased, more German troops would be tied up in Denmark.

The Danish Resistance used the country's proximity to Sweden to great effect. Stockholm became a base for the Danish Resistance. Here they were far safer than in Denmark — but they could easily get back to their country.

== See also ==
- BOPA
- Holger Danske (resistance group)
- The Shadow in My Eye

== Sources ==
- Hæestrup, Jørgen. Secret Alliance - A Study of the Danish Resistance Movement 1940-45. Vols I, II & III. Odense University Press, 1976–77. ISBN 87-7492-168-1, ISBN 87-7492-194-0 & ISBN 87-7492-212-2.
- Moore, Bob (editor). Resistance in Western Europe (esp. Chapter on Denmark by Hans Kirchoff), Oxford : Berg, 2000, ISBN 1-85973-279-8.
