= Danish resistance movement =

Movement in resistance to the German occupation of Denmark during World War II

Danish Resistance
- Part of European theatre of World War II and Occupation of Denmark
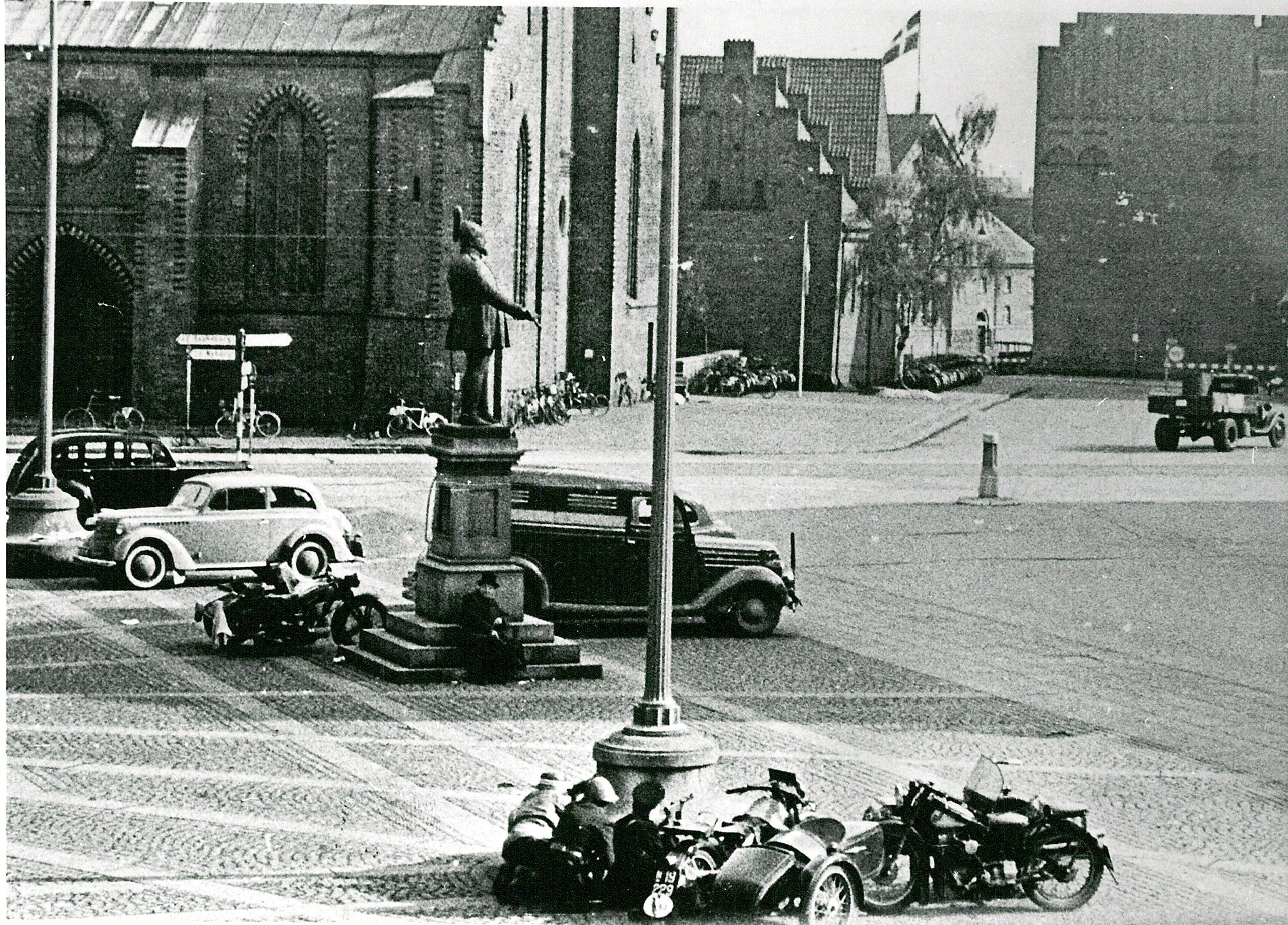
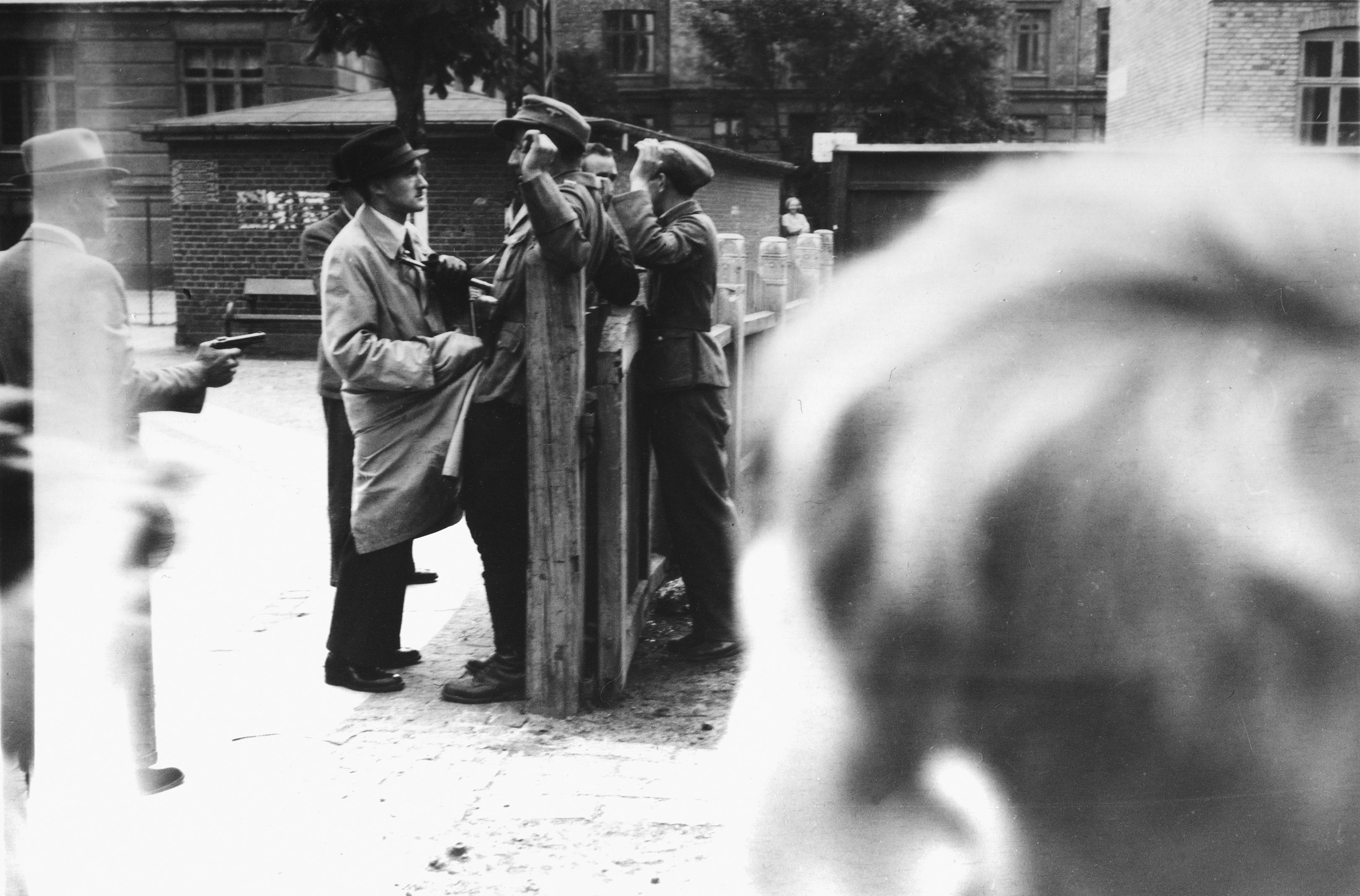
- Danish resistance fighters battling German soldiers 5 May 1945. Flakhaven, Odense (left), Danish SS soldiers disarmed by resistance fighters in Copenhagen, 1945 (right)
Date	Nonviolent resistance: 9 April 1940 – 29 August 1943; Violent resistance: August 29, 1943 – 5 May 1945
Location	Denmark
Result	German Surrender; Liberation of Denmark; Landing at Bornholm

Belligerents
Danish resistance groups Denmark (from 1943); Supplied by United Kingdom	(Denmark) Occupation Government (until 1943) (Nazi Germany) Germany

Commanders and leaders
(Denmark) Frode Jakobsen (Denmark) Bent Faurschou Hviid † (Denmark) Marius Fiil (executed) (Denmark) Povl Falk-Jensen (Denmark) Various Danish resistance leaders	(Nazi Germany) Leonhard Kaupisch (Nazi Germany) Werner Best (Nazi Germany) (Denmark) Frits Clausen (Denmark) Christian Frederik von Schalburg †

Units involved
(Denmark) Danish Brigade in Sweden	Schalburg Corps (Nazi Germany) Heer soldiers (Nazi Germany) Gestapo (Nazi Germany) Kriegsmarine; Waffen-SS: Free Corps Denmark (until 1943)

Casualties and losses
About 850 resistance fighters	
- 600 Danish civilians

The Danish resistance movements (Danish: Den danske modstandsbevægelse) were an underground insurgency to resist the German occupation of Denmark during World War II. Due to the initially lenient arrangements, which allowed the democratic government to remain in power, the resistance movement was slower to develop effective tactics on a wide scale than in some other countries.

Members of the Danish resistance movement were involved in underground activities, ranging from producing illegal publications to spying and sabotage. The resistance was responsible for the rescue of almost all Danish Jews. Major groups included the communist BOPA (Danish: Borgerlige Partisaner, Civil Partisans) and Holger Danske, both based in Copenhagen. Some small resistance groups such as the Samsing Group and the Churchill Club also contributed to the sabotage effort. Resistance agents killed an estimated 400 Danish Nazis, informers and collaborators until 1944. After that date, they also killed some German nationals.

In the postwar period, the Resistance was supported by politicians within Denmark and there was little effort to closely examine the killings. Studies in the late 20th and early 21st centuries revealed cases of improvised and contingent decision making about the targets, including morally ambiguous choices. Several important books and films have been produced on this topic.

== Nonviolent resistance: 1940–1943 ==
=== The "model protectorate" ===
During the invasion of Denmark on April 9, 1940 and subsequent occupation, the Danish king and government chose not to flee the country and instead collaborated with the German authorities who allowed the Danish government to remain in power. The Germans had reasons to do so, especially as they wanted to showcase Denmark as a "model protectorate", earning the nickname the Cream Front (German: Sahnefront), due to the relative ease of the occupation and copious amount of dairy products. As the democratically elected Danish government remained in power, Danish citizens had less motivation to fight the occupation than in countries where the Germans established puppet governments, such as Norway or France. The police also remained under Danish authority and led by Danes.

Daily life in Denmark remained much the same as before the occupation. The Germans did make certain changes: imposing official censorship, prohibiting dealings with the Allies, and stationing German troops in the country. The Danish government actively discouraged violent resistance because it feared a severe backlash from the Germans against the civilian population.

=== Resistance groups ===
Immediately after the occupation began, isolated attempts were made to set up resistance and intelligence activities. Intelligence officers from the Danish army, known as the "Princes," began channeling reports to London allies as early as April 13, 1940. Soon afterwards, Ebbe Munck, a journalist from Berlingske Tidende, arranged to be transferred to Stockholm. From there he could more easily report to and communicate with the British.

Following Germany's invasion of the Soviet Union on June 22, 1941 the Germans banned the Danish Communist Party and had the Danish police arrest its members. Those members who either avoided arrest or later escaped thus went underground and created resistance cells. From October 1942, they published a clandestine newspaper, Land og Folk ("Land and People"), based on the previous Communist Party newspaper, Arbejderbladet, which was distributed widely across the country. Circulation grew to 120,000 copies per day by the end of the occupation. At the beginning of 1943, the cells were centrally coordinated under BOPA (Borgerlige Partisaner – Civil Partisans), which also began to plan acts of sabotage.

As time went on, many other insurgent groups formed to oppose the occupation. These included the Hvidsten group, which received weapons parachuted by the British, and Holger Danske, which was successful in organizing sabotage activities and the assassinations of collaborators. The Churchill club, one of the first resistance groups in Denmark, was a group of eight schoolboys from Aalborg. They performed some 25 acts of sabotage against the Germans, destroying Nazi German assets with makeshift grenades and stealing Nazi German weapons.

When the Germans forced the Danish government to sign the Anti-Comintern Pact, a large protest broke out in Copenhagen.

The number of Danish Nazis was low before the war, and this trend continued throughout the occupation. This was confirmed in the 1943 parliamentary elections, in which the population voted overwhelmingly for the four traditional parties, or abstained. The latter option was widely interpreted as votes for the Danish Communist Party. The election was a disappointment for the National Socialist Workers' Party of Denmark (DNSAP) and German Reichsbevollmächtigter. Dr. Werner Best abandoned plans to create a government under Danish Nazi leader Frits Clausen, due to Clausen's lack of public support.

Helping fan the flames of resistance, Danish writers did their bit. Karen Blixen, AKA Isak Dinesen, wrote the book Gengældelsens veje (translated into English as The Angelic Avengers) under the pseudonym Pierre Andrézel during the occupation.

In 1942–43, resistance operations gradually shifted to more violent action, most notably acts of sabotage. Various groups succeeded in making contacts with the British Special Operations Executive (SOE) which began making airdrops of agents and supplies. There were not many drops until August 1944, but they increased through the end of the occupation. In total throughout the war, over 600 tons of weapons, equipment and explosives were airdropped to the Danish resistance by the Allies, while fifty-three SOE agents were dispatched to Denmark.

=== Military intelligence operations ===
On 23 April 1940, members of Danish military intelligence established contacts with their British counterparts through the British diplomatic mission in Stockholm. The first intelligence dispatch was sent by messenger to the Stockholm mission in the autumn of 1940. This evolved into regular dispatches of military and political intelligence, and by 1942–43, the number of dispatches had increased to at least one per week. In addition, an employee of Danmarks Radio was able to transmit short messages to Britain through the national broadcasting network.

The intelligence was gathered mostly by officers in the Danish army and navy; they reported information about political developments, the location and size of German military units, and details about the Danish section of the Atlantic Wall fortifications. In 1942, the Germans demanded the removal of the Danish military from Jutland, but intelligence operations continued. It was carried out by plainclothes personnel or by reserve officers, since this group was not included in the evacuation order. Following the liberation of Denmark, Field Marshal Bernard Law Montgomery described the intelligence gathered in Denmark as "second to none".

== Violent resistance: 1943–1945 ==
Denmark Fights for Freedom, a 1944 U.S. propaganda film about the Danish resistance movement.

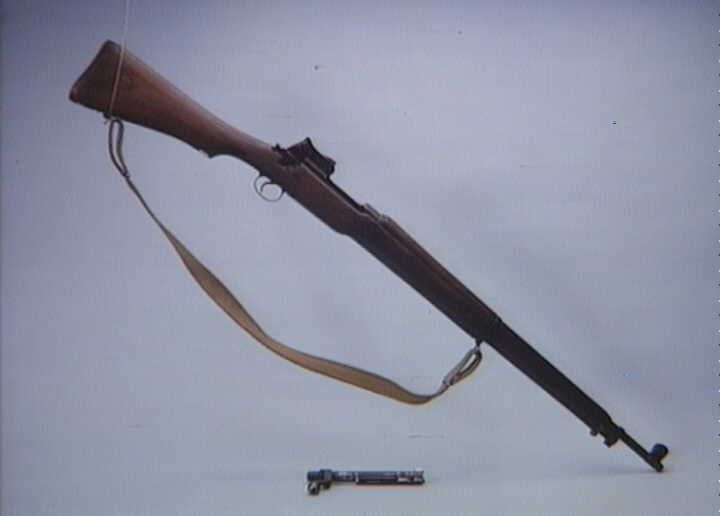
M1917 Enfield used by a resistance group in Haslev.

As the years went by, the number of acts of sabotage and violence grew. In 1943, the number grew dramatically, to the point that the German authorities became dissatisfied with the Danish authorities' handling of the situation. At the end of August, the Germans took over full administration in Denmark, which allowed them to deal with the population as they wished. The Germans raided every police station in Denmark, disarmed, arrested and deported all 2,000 Danish police officers to Germany. Policing became easier for the Nazis, but more and more people became involved with the movement because they were no longer worried about protecting the Danish government.

In particular, the Danish Freedom Council was set up in September 1943, bringing together the various resistance groups in order to improve their efficiency and resolve. An underground government was established. Allied governments, who had been skeptical about Denmark's commitment to fight Germany, began recognising it as a full ally.

Due to concerns about prisoners and information held in Gestapo headquarters at the Shellhus in the centre of Copenhagen, the resistance repeatedly requested a tactical RAF raid on the headquarters to destroy records and release prisoners. Britain initially turned down the request due to the risk of civilian casualties, but eventually launched Operation Carthage, a very low-level raid by 20 de Havilland Mosquito fighter-bombers, escorted by 30 P-51 Mustang fighters. The raid succeeded in destroying the headquarters, releasing 18 prisoners of the Gestapo, and disrupting anti-resistance operations throughout Denmark. However, 125 civilians lost their lives due to the errant bombing of a nearby boarding school.

== Actions ==
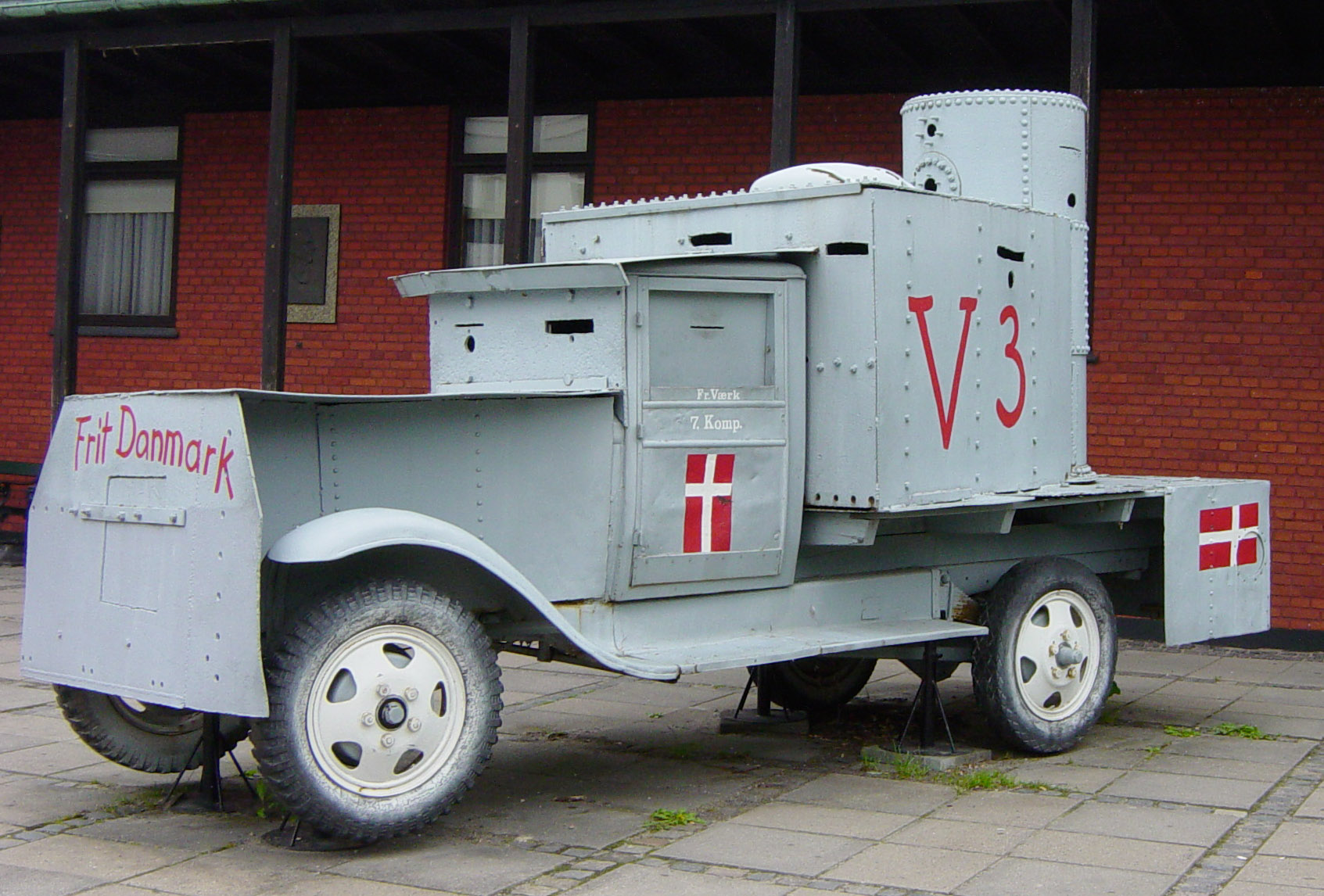
Railway shop workers in Frederiksværk built this armored car for offensive use by the Danish resistance. It was employed against Danish Nazis, known as the Lorenzen group, entrenched in the plantation of Asserbo in North Zealand. May 5, 1945

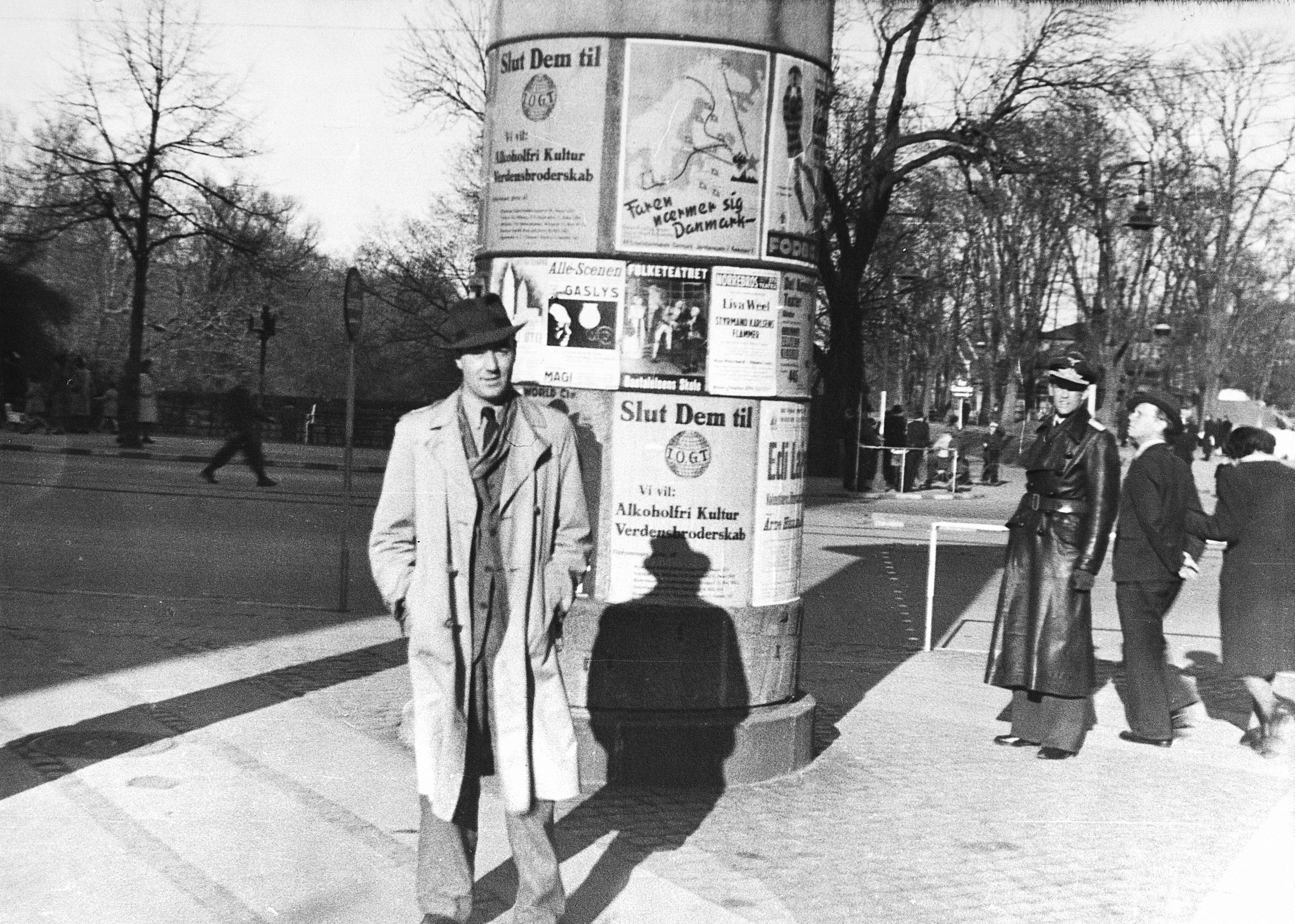
An American pilot in occupied Copenhagen photographed by the Danish resistance while a German pilot looks on. March, 1945

In 1943, the movement scored a great success in rescuing all but 500 of Denmark's Jewish population of 7,000–8,000 from being sent to the Nazi concentration camps by helping transport them to neutral Sweden, where they were given asylum. The Danish resistance movement has been honoured as a collective at Yad Vashem in Israel as being part of the "Righteous Among the Nations". They were honoured as a collective rather than as individuals at their own request.

Another success was the disruption of the Danish railway network in the days after D-Day, which delayed the movement of German troops to France as reinforcements.

During the war, the organized resistance movement in Denmark scored many successes. It is believed to have killed nearly 400 (the top official number is 385) Danish Nazis, informers or collaborators thought to pose a threat to the Resistance, or Danes working for the Gestapo, from 1943 through 1945. The rationale behind the executions was discussed, and several accounts by participants said a committee identified targets, but no historic evidence of this system has been found. In the postwar period, while the killings were criticized, they were also defended by such politicians as Frode Jakobsen and Per Federspiel.

The movement lost slightly more than 850 members in action, in prison, in Nazi concentration camps, or (in the case of 102 resistance members) executed following a court-martial.

The Danish National Museum maintains the Museum of Danish Resistance in Copenhagen.

Since the late 20th century, there has been more discussion about the morality of some of the killings carried out by the resistance, sparked by a TV series about the death of Jane Horney, a Danish citizen killed at sea in what Frode Jakobsen defended as an act of war.

With the 60th anniversary of the end of the war, the issue was re-examined in two new studies: Stefan Emkjar's Stikkerdrab and Peter Ovig Knudsen's Etter drabet, "the first profound approaches into the topic." Both authors contacted veterans of the resistance movement, and covered the sometimes contingent, improvised nature of some of the actions. It suggested that some of the noted Bent Faurschou-Hviid (Flammen)'s executions may have been mistakenly directed by a double agent. Knudsen's work was adapted as a two-hour documentary film, With the Right to Kill (2003), which was shown on TV and later released in theaters. These works have contributed to a national discussion on the topic.

Flame and Citron (Flammen og Citronen, 2008) is a fictionalized drama film based on historic accounts of two prominent Danish resistance fighters, directed by Ole Christian Madsen. It portrays some of the moral ambiguity of their actions.

== Prominent members ==
- Anton Poul Andersen
- Børge Bak
- Poul Bruun
- Henning Bysted
- Ellen Christensen
- Tom Dencker-Grant
- Gunnar Dyrberg
- Sven Fage-Pedersen
- Povl Falk-Jensen
- Bent Faurschou-Hviid (Flammen)
- Marius Fiil
- Niels Fiil
- Mogens Fog
- Jutta Graae
- Frode Jakobsen
- Leif Jensen
- Erling Jensen
- Jørgen Jenk
- Ove Kampmann
- Christer Lyst Hansen
- Søren Hoff
- Jørgen Kieler
- Ole Lippmann
- Jørgen Strange Lorenzen
- Lone Maslocha
- Kim Malthe-Bruun
- Preben Munch-Nielsen
- Flemming Muus
- John Christmas Møller
- Poul Nielsen
- Knud Pedersen
- Niels Eberhard Petersen
- Poul Kristian Brandt Rehberg
- Jørgen Røjel
- Find Sandgren
- Jørgen Haagen Schmith (Citronen)
- David John Valdemar Schultz (1923–2014)
- Niels Aage Skov
- Thomas Sneum
- Hans Edvard Teglers
- Monica Wichfeld
- Varinka Wichfeld-Muus

== Strategic result ==
The extent to which the Danish resistance played an important strategic role in the war has been the subject of much discussion. Immediately after the war and until about 1970, the vast majority of accounts overrated the degree to which the resistance had been effective in battling against the Germans by acts of sabotage and by providing key intelligence to the Allies. More recently, however, after re-examining the archives, historians concur that, while the resistance provided a firm basis for moral support and paved the way for post-war governments, the strategic effect during the occupation was limited. The Germans did not need to send reinforcements to suppress the movement, and garrisoned the country with a comparatively small number of Wehrmacht troops. The resistance did not enter into prolonged active combat or succeed in liberating any part of the country. Even the overall importance of Danish intelligence in the context of Ultra is questioned.

In his history, No Small Achievement: Special Operations Executive and the Danish Resistance 1940-1945 (2002), Knud Jespersen examined the relationship between British Intelligence and the Danish Resistance. He quoted a report from SHAEF stating that the resistance in Denmark.

"caused strain and embarrassment to the enemy...[and a] striking reduction in the flow of troops and stores from Norway [that] undoubtedly had an adverse effect on the reinforcements for the battles East and West of the Rhine."

Examining the British archives, Jespersen also found a report concluding "that the overall effect of Danish resistance was to restore national pride and political unity." He agreed that this was the movement's most important contribution to the nation.

== Representation in other media ==
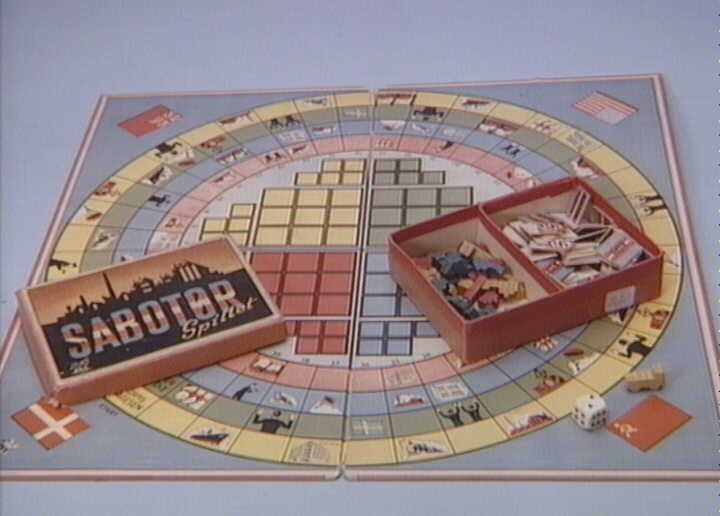
Sabotørspillet, "The Saboteur Game", published in 1945—showcasing the saboteur as a hero

=== Books ===
- Carol Matas's 1987 and 1989 novels Lisa and Jesper presented fictionalized accounts of Danish resistance missions.
- Ken Follett's 2002 suspense novel Hornet Flight presents a fictionalized account of early Danish resistance.
- Stefan Emkjar's Stikkerdrab (Killing of Informers: The Resistance Movements' Liquidation of Danes during the Occupation, 2000) and Peter Øvig Knudsen's Etter drabet (Following the Death: Reports of the Resistance Liquidations, 2001), were both non-fiction studies of the resistance, published before the 60th anniversary of the end of the war.
- Number the Stars (1989), children's historical fiction novel by Lois Lowry, won the Newbery Medal.
- Barry Clemson's alternative history novel, Denmark Rising (2009), imagines a Denmark that implemented a total resistance to the Nazis via strategic nonviolence.
- Povl Falk-Jensen's Holger Danske - Afdeling Eigils sabotager og stikkerlikvideringer under Besættelsen (2010), Danish resistance member Povl Falk-Jensen's memoir. Povl Falk-Jensen was a leading member of the Danish resistance group Holger Danske during World War II and responsible for eleven executions of informers or collaborators.
- H. George Frederickson's 1997 text The Spirit of Public Administration compares the response of the bureaucracy in Denmark to other European nations to the rise of the Nazi party and Adolf Hitler.
- Aage Bertelsen's "October '43" (1954) An autobiographical account of the Jewish escape to Sweden in 1943, written by a prominent member of the Danish resistance. Originally written in Danish, but translated into other languages. Author not to be confused with famous Danish painter Aage Bertelsen.

=== Film ===
- The Twentieth Century with Walter Cronkite: episode Sabotage. CBS approximately 1960. Black and white.
- Flame and Citron (Flammen og Citronen) (2008) is a drama film based on two prominent Danish resistance fighters; it is directed by Ole Christian Madsen.
- Miracle at Midnight (1998), American made-for-TV movie about the rescue of the Jews in Denmark, starring Sam Waterston and Mia Farrow, featuring neighbors helping a family escape to Sweden.
- The Boys from St. Petri, a 1991 Danish drama film.
- The Only Way, A 1970 war drama film about the rescue of the Danish Jews starring Jane Seymour.
- This Life (Hvidstengruppen) (2012) is a Danish drama film based on the activities of the Hvidsten Group.
- With the Right to Kill (Med ret til at dræbe, 2003), is a documentary adapted from the 2001 book by journalist Peter Øvig Knudsen and directed by Morten Henriksen; it explores the liquidation of nearly 400 people by the Resistance during World War II from 1943 through 1945. It won a Robert Award in 2004 for best full-length documentary.
- Omvej til friheden (Detour to freedom), a made-for-TV documentary movie about two Jewish families attempting to flee to neutral Sweden and featuring actual Jewish survivors and members of the Danish resistance.
- Land of Mine, a 2015 Danish film nominated for Oscar for Best Foreign Film, about young German POWs clearing Nazi beach mines. Director: Martin Zandvliet from IMDB.
- Netflix holds distribution rights to a Danish movie The Bombardment, which was first released in October 2021 in Denmark. The film is also known The Shadow in My Eye (Skyggen i mit øje in Danish) and Netflix released the movie in March 2022.

=== Music ===
- "Denmark 1943", a song by Fred Small on his album I Will Stand Fast
