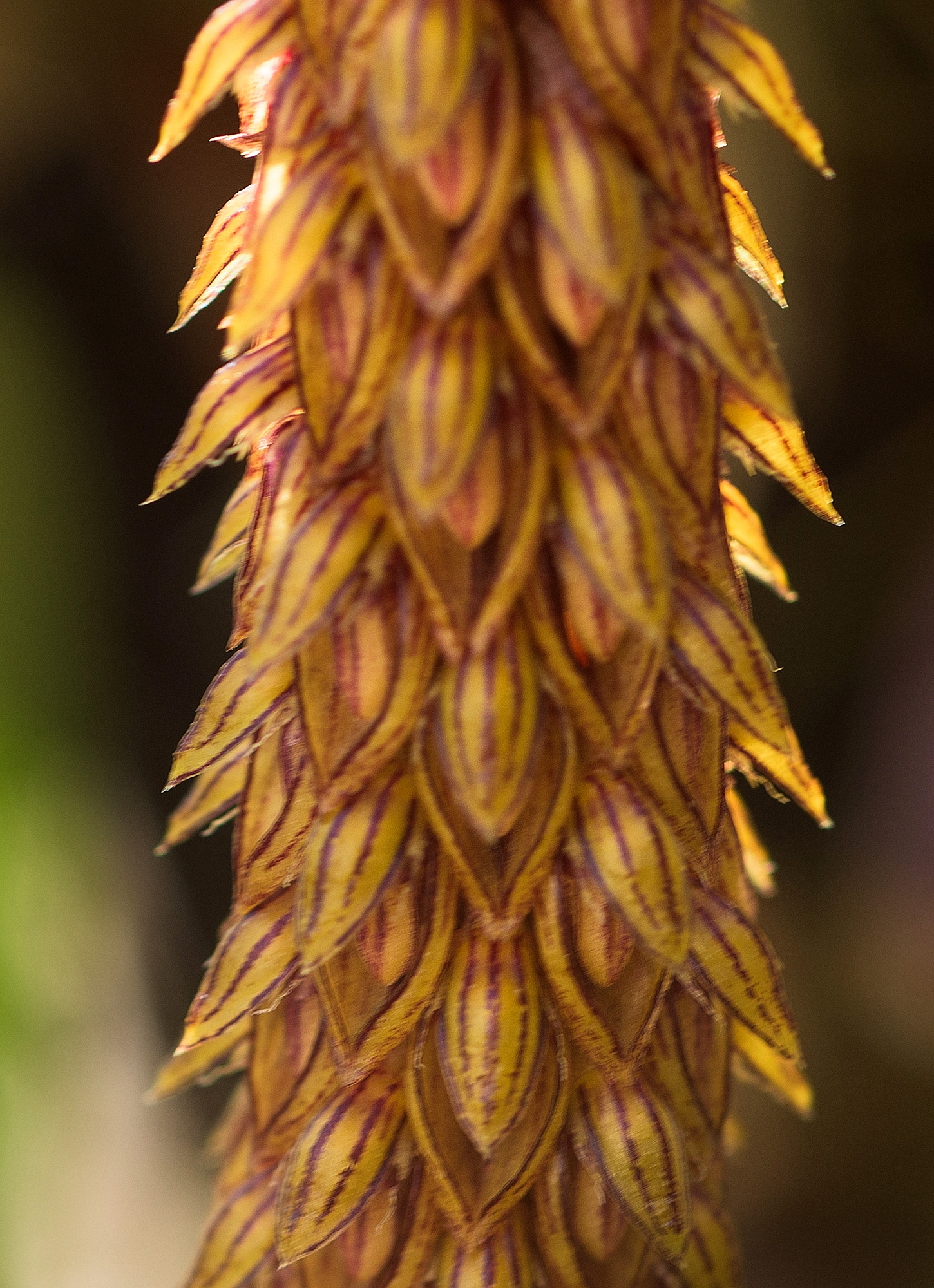
- Bulbophyllum careyanum

Scientific classification
- Kingdom: Plantae
- Clade: Tracheophytes
- Clade: Angiosperms
- Clade: Monocots
- Order: Asparagales
- Family: Orchidaceae
- Subfamily: Epidendroideae
- Genus: Bulbophyllum
- Section: Bulbophyllum sect. Racemosae; Benth & Hook.f. 1883

Type species
- Bulbophyllum careyanum

Species
- See text

Synonyms
- Bulbophyllum sect. Anisopetalum [Hkr.] Lindl. 1846; Bulbophyllum sect. Careyana Pfitzer 1888

= Bulbophyllum sect. Racemosae =

Section of flowering plants

Bulbophyllum sect. Racemosae is a section of the genus Bulbophyllum.

== Description ==
Species in this section are creeping epiphytes with shoots developing from the nodes and many flowered inflorescence.

== Distribution ==
Plants from this section are found in Southeast Asia.

== Species ==
Bulbophyllum section Racemosae comprises the following species:

Image	Name	Distribution	Elevation (m)
	Bulbophyllum albidostylidium Seidenf. 1995	Thailand	
	Bulbophyllum allenkerrii Seidenf. 1979	Vietnam, Laos, and Thailand	1,300–1,700 metres (4,300–5,600 ft)
	Bulbophyllum bariense Gagnep. 1930	Vietnam	0–700 metres (0–2,297 ft)
	Bulbophyllum bittnerianum Schlechter 1910	Thailand	
	Bulbophyllum brevispicatum Z.H.Tsi & S.C.Chen 1994	China	1,320 metres (4,330 ft)
	Bulbophyllum careyanum (Hook.) Spreng. 1826	eastern Himalayas, Assam, Nepal, Bhutan, Sikkim, Myanmar, Thailand, and Vietnam	200–2,100 metres (660–6,890 ft)
	Bulbophyllum chrysolabium L.Li & D.P.Ye 2018	Yunnan province of China	1,400–1,600 metres (4,600–5,200 ft)
	Bulbophyllum crassipes Hook. f. 1896	Assam, eastern Himalayas, Bhutan, India, Andaman Islands, Myanmar, Thailand, Laos and Vietnam	1,100–1,200 metres (3,600–3,900 ft)
	Bulbophyllum cuneatum Rolfe ex Ames 1905	Philippines	1,000 metres (3,300 ft)
	Bulbophyllum cupreum Lindley 1838	Myanmar, the Malaysian peninsula and the Philippines	500 metres (1,600 ft)
	Bulbophyllum dissitiflorum Seidenf. 1979	Thailand	1,200–1,500 metres (3,900–4,900 ft)
	Bulbophyllum elassonotum Summerh. 1935	Vietnam	0–1,200 metres (0–3,937 ft)
	Bulbophyllum insulsoides Seidenf. 1973 publ. 1974	Taiwan	1,000–2,000 metres (3,300–6,600 ft)
	Bulbophyllum intricatum Seidenf. 1979	Thailand	550–1,550 metres (1,800–5,090 ft)
	Bulbophyllum invisum Ames 1922	Philippines (Luzon)	2,200 metres (7,200 ft)
	Bulbophyllum laoticum Gagnep. 1830	Laos	
	Bulbophyllum lilacinum Ridl. 1896	Peninsular Malaysia and Thailand	
	Bulbophyllum longibracteatum Seidenf. 1979	Thailand and Laos	400–1,600 metres (1,300–5,200 ft)
	Bulbophyllum luanii Tixier 1965	Vietnam and Thailand	1,300–2,600 metres (4,300–8,500 ft)
	Bulbophyllum macrocoleum Seidenf. 1979	Vietnam and Thailand	300–1,400 metres (980–4,590 ft)
	Bulbophyllum microtepalum Rchb. f. 1864	Myanmar and Thailand	200 metres (660 ft)
	Bulbophyllum morphologorum Kraenzl. 1908	Thailand and Vietnam	900–1,400 metres (3,000–4,600 ft)
	Bulbophyllum nesiotes Seidenf. 1979	Thailand	200 metres (660 ft)
	Bulbophyllum orientale Seidenf. 1979	Southern Yunnan China, Thailand and Vietnam	500–2,300 metres (1,600–7,500 ft)
	Bulbophyllum papillipetalum Ames 1922	Philippines (Luzon)	2,300 metres (7,500 ft)
	Bulbophyllum peninsulare Seidenf 1979	Thailand	300–500 metres (980–1,640 ft)
	Bulbophyllum phayamense Seidenf. 1979	Andaman Island in southern Thailand	
	Bulbophyllum propinquum Kraenzl. 1908	Thailand	1,400 metres (4,600 ft)
	Bulbophyllum putii Seidenf. 1979	Thailand and Vietnam	
	Bulbophyllum rosemarianum Sath.Kumar 2001	India	
	Bulbophyllum rufilabrum Parish ex Hook. f. 1890	Thailand, Myanmar and India	500–600 metres (1,600–2,000 ft)
	Bulbophyllum rufinum Rchb.f 1900	India, eastern Himalayas, Myanmar, Thailand, Cambodia, Laos, and Vietnam	150–1,000 metres (490–3,280 ft)
	Bulbophyllum sicyobulbon Parish & Rchb. f. 1874	Myanmar, Malaysia and Thailand	1,400 metres (4,600 ft)
	Bulbophyllum sterile (Lam.) Suresh 1988	Nilgiri Hills of India	1,300–1,700 metres (4,300–5,600 ft)
	Bulbophyllum striatulum Aver. 2016	Vietnam	600–1,000 metres (2,000–3,300 ft)
	Bulbophyllum thaithongiae Taosiri & Seelanan 2025	Thailand	
	Bulbophyllum tricorne Seidenf. & Smitin. 1965	Thailand	700–800 metres (2,300–2,600 ft)
	Bulbophyllum tricornoides Seidenf. 1979	Thailand	1,200–1,290 metres (3,940–4,230 ft)
	Bulbophyllum trigonanthum J.J.Verm., Watthana & H.A.Pedersen 2021	Thailand (Loei)	1,200–1,300 metres (3,900–4,300 ft)
	Bulbophyllum tridentatum Kraenzl. 1901	Thailand	
	Bulbophyllum triviale Seidenf. 1979	Thailand	1,950 metres (6,400 ft)
	Bulbophyllum vulinhiae Vuong, Duong, V.S.Dang & Aver. 2021	Vietnam	
	Bulbophyllum wangkaense Seidenf. 1979	Thailand	200 to 300 metres (660 to 980 ft)
	Bulbophyllum xanthum Ridl. 1920	peninsular Malaysia	270 to 800 metres (890 to 2,620 ft)
