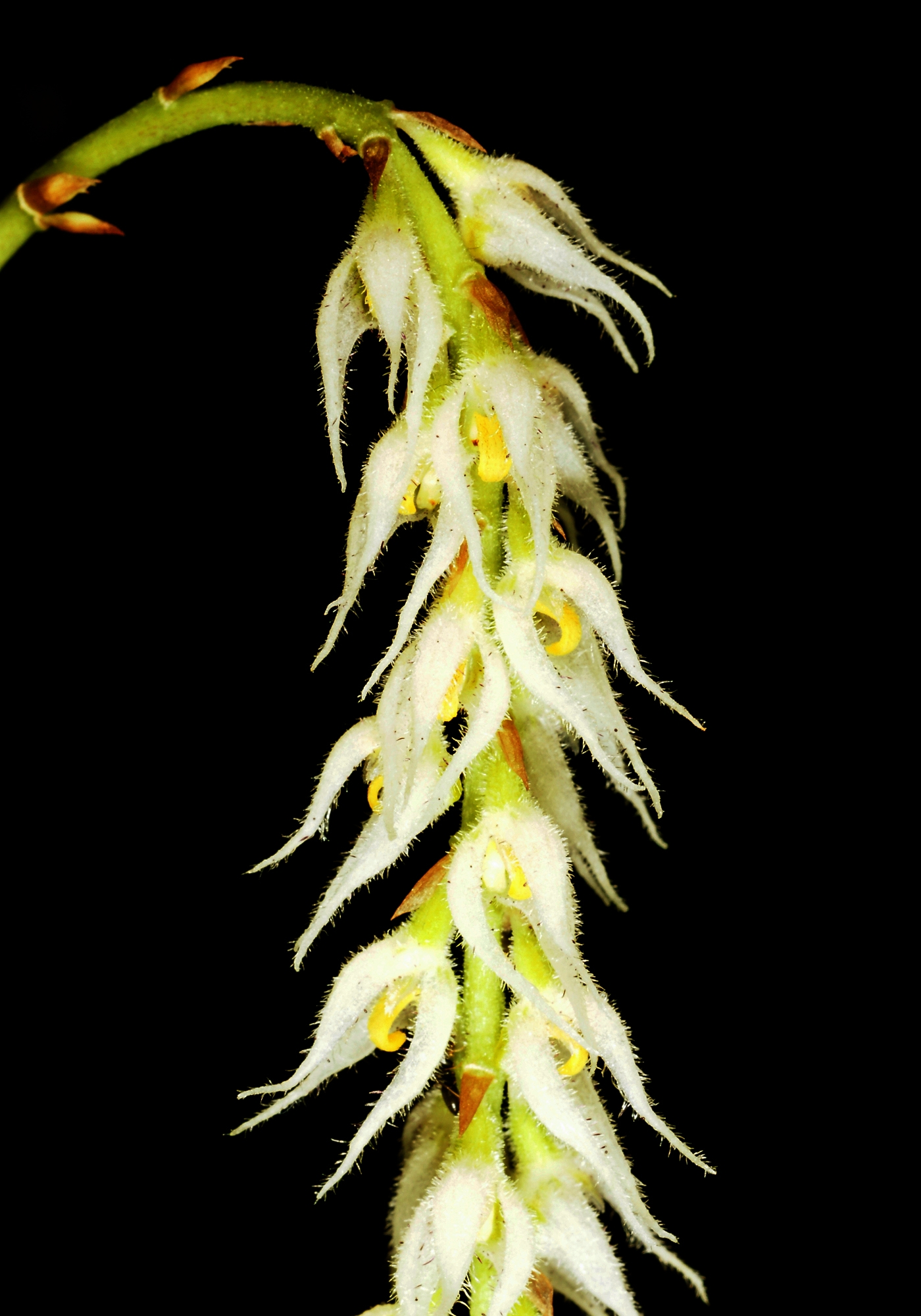
- Bulbophyllum hirtum

Scientific classification
- Kingdom: Plantae
- Clade: Tracheophytes
- Clade: Angiosperms
- Clade: Monocots
- Order: Asparagales
- Family: Orchidaceae
- Subfamily: Epidendroideae
- Genus: Bulbophyllum
- Section: Bulbophyllum sect. Lemniscata; Pfitz 1889

Type species
- Bulbophyllum lemniscatum

Species
- See text

= Bulbophyllum sect. Lemniscata =

Section of flowering plants

Bulbophyllum sect. Lemniscata is a section of the genus Bulbophyllum.

== Description ==
Species in this section have creeping rhizomes and a pseudobulb with two or more deciduous leaves. Plants in this section bloom on a pendulous rachis with multiple flowers facing multiple directions.

== Distribution ==
Plants from this section are found in Southeast Asia.

== Species ==
Bulbophyllum section Lemniscata comprises the following species:

Image	Name	Distribution	Elevation (m)
	Bulbophyllum albibracteum Seidenf. 1979	Thailand and China (Yunnan)	1,800–2,000 metres (5,900–6,600 ft)
	Bulbophyllum auricomum Lindl. 1830	Thailand, Myanmar, Sumatra and Java	
	Bulbophyllum averyanovii Seidenf. 1992	Vietnam	
	Bulbophyllum cariniflorum Rchb. f. 1861	Nepal, Bhutan, India, Thailand to Vietnam and Southern China	1,100–2,100 metres (3,600–6,900 ft)
	Bulbophyllum comosum Collett & Hemsl. 1890	India, Thailand, Myanmar and Vietnam	1,850–2,000 metres (6,070–6,560 ft)
	Bulbophyllum contortum Z.Zhou, P.Y.Wu & Z.J.Liu 2022	China (Yunnan)	2,100 metres (6,900 ft)
	Bulbophyllum dhaninivatii Seidenf. 1965	Thailand	1,100–1,200 metres (3,600–3,900 ft)
	Bulbophyllum gopalianum Sâwmliana, M., K. Gogoi, J.S. Jalal and P. Kumar 2024	India (Mizoram), Myanmar	1,600–1,800 metres (5,200–5,900 ft)
	Bulbophyllum hirtum [Sm.]Lindl. 1828	India (Assam), Nepal, Sikkim, Thailand, Myanmar and Vietnam	800–2,700 metres (2,600–8,900 ft)
	Bulbophyllum lancifolium Ames 1912	Philippines	2,600 metres (8,500 ft)
	Bulbophyllum lemniscatoides Rolfe 1890	Borneo, Java, Sumatra, the Philippines, Thailand, Vietnam and Laos	300–1,670 metres (980–5,480 ft)
	Bulbophyllum lemniscatum Par.ex Hook.f. 1872	Thailand and Myanmar	400 metres (1,300 ft)
	Bulbophyllum linearifolium King & Pantl. 1897	Peninsula Malaysia	
	Bulbophyllum menglaense Jian W.Li & X.H.Jin 2017	China (Yunnan)	1,100–1,250 metres (3,610–4,100 ft)
	Bulbophyllum muscarirubrum Seidenf. 1979	Thailand	1,000–1,500 metres (3,300–4,900 ft)
	Bulbophyllum pallidum Seidenf. 1979	Thailand	1,500–1,600 metres (4,900–5,200 ft)
	Bulbophyllum reichenbachii (Kuntze) Schltr. 1915	Myanmar and Thailand	900 metres (3,000 ft)
	Bulbophyllum romklaoense N Thawara, T Pingyot, P Suksathan, S Ruchisansakun 2024	Thailand	1,300 metres (4,300 ft)
	Bulbophyllum shanicum King & Pantl. 1897	China (Yunnan) and Myanmar	1,800–1,900 metres (5,900–6,200 ft)
	Bulbophyllum sphenoglossum J.J.Verm., Watthana & H.A.Pedersen 2021	Thailand (Chiang Mai)	1,800 metres (5,900 ft)
	Bulbophyllum suavissimum Rolfe 1889	Thailand and Myanmar	900–1,700 metres (3,000–5,600 ft)
	Bulbophyllum sukhakulii Seidenf. 1995	Thailand	
	Bulbophyllum triste Rchb. f. 1861	India, Nepal, Sikkim, Myanmar and Thailand	800–1,800 metres (2,600–5,900 ft)
