= Seidenfaden =

Seidenfaden (German for silk thread) may refer to:

- Tøger Seidenfaden (1957-2011), Danish journalist
- Gunnar Seidenfaden (1908-2001), Danish diplomat
- Erik Seidenfaden (ethnologist) (1881–1958), Danish ethnologist
- Erik Seidenfaden (journalist) (1910-1990), Danish journalist
- Ebba Merete Seidenfaden (1940-1980), better known as Snu Abecassis, Danish-born Portuguese publisher
- Seidenfaden, a part of the municipality Wipperfürth in North Rhine-Westphalia, Germany
