= Erik Seidenfaden =

Erik Seidenfaden may refer to:

- Erik Seidenfaden (ethnologist) (1881–1958), Danish ethnologist
- Erik Seidenfaden (journalist) (1910–1990), Danish journalist, father of Tøger Seidenfaden
