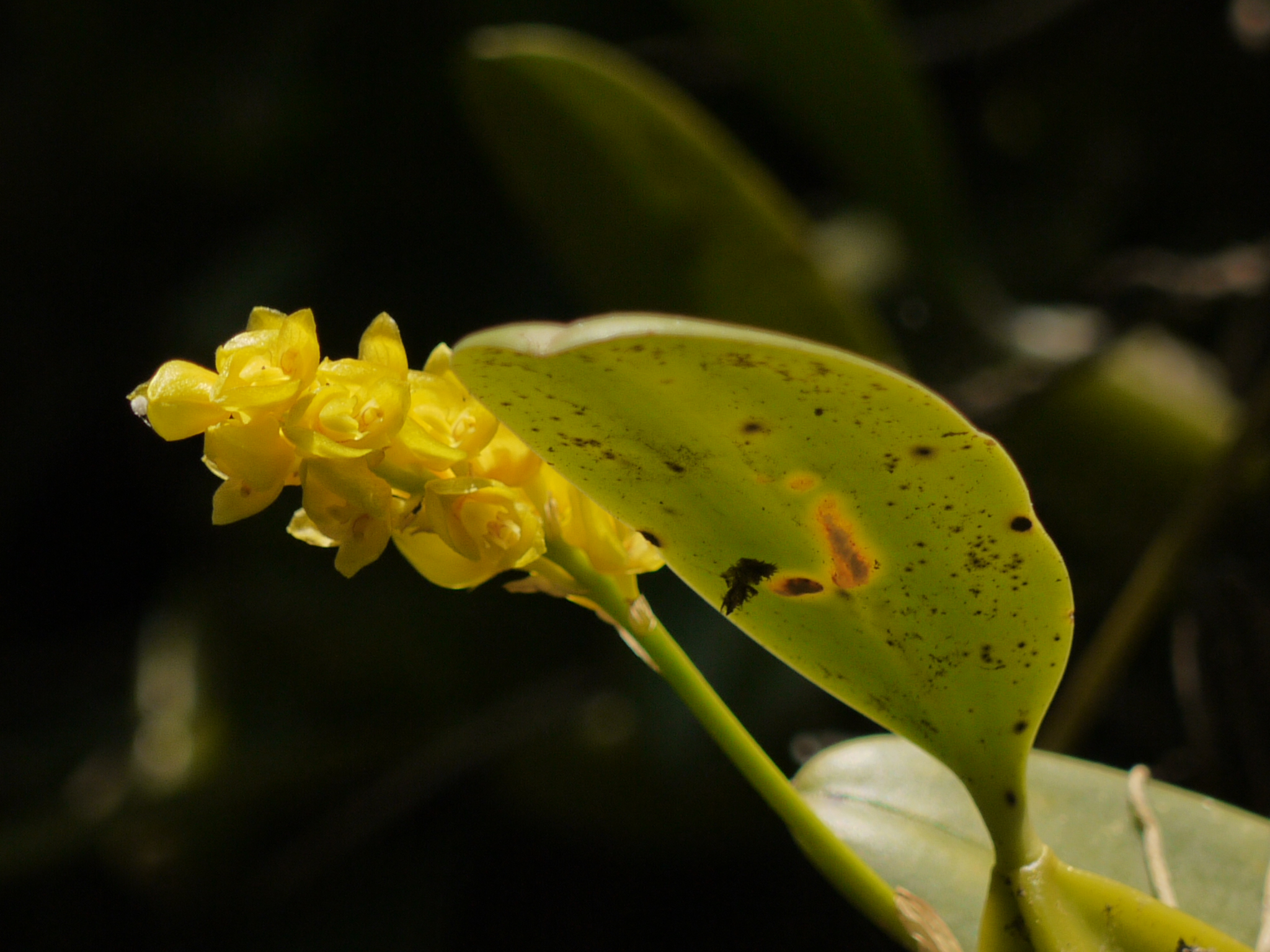

Scientific classification
- Kingdom: Plantae
- Clade: Tracheophytes
- Clade: Angiosperms
- Clade: Monocots
- Order: Asparagales
- Family: Orchidaceae
- Subfamily: Epidendroideae
- Genus: Bulbophyllum
- Species: B. rosemarianum

Binomial name
- Bulbophyllum rosemarianum C. S. Kumar, P. C. S. Kumar & Saleem

= Bulbophyllum rosemarianum =

Species of plant

Bulbophyllum rosemarianum is a species of orchid in the genus Bulbophyllum.

== Description ==
It is an epiphyte with 1-leaved pseudobulbs on creeping rhizomes. The pseudobulbs are pale yellow-green, 1.7–3.5 cm long and 1.1–1.6 cm wide, and are spaced out along a thick, wiry stem. The leaves are 5–18 cm long and 1.6–3.2 cm wide, standing upright, oblong, thick, and fleshy with a deep groove in the middle, tapering to a short petiole at the base and blunt at the tip. The flower stalk grows from the base of the pseudobulb, is pale green, longer than the leaves, and is 5.5–9.2 cm long. It has 4 cup-like sterile bracts and a short flower cluster (4–5 cm) of pale yellow flowers that smell like ripe jackfruit or mango.

This belongs to the Section Racemosae Benth & Hook.f. and is related to B. rufilabrum Par. & Rchb.f., but different in having erect, non-geotropic leaves, truncate-angulate, acute dorsal sepal, broad-based, oblique, falcate-aristate petal and yellow lip with brown papilla throughout except the median furrow.
