= Ordrup Cemetery =

Cemetery in Copenhagen, Denmark

- Interactive map of Ordrup Cemetery

Details
- Established: 1892
- Location: Ordrup, Gentofte Municipality Copenhagen
- Country: Denmark
- Coordinates: 55°43′54″N 12°33′33″E
- Type: Municipal
- Owned by: Gentofte Municipality
- Size: 5.74 ha (14.2 acres)

Ordrup Cemetery (Danish: Ordrup Kirkegård) is a cemetery in Ordrup in the northern suburbs of Copenhagen, Denmark. It is the principal cemetery for the districts of Skovshoved, Ordrup, and Charlottenlund in the parishes of Ordrup and Skovshoved.

== History ==
The cemetery was created in 1892. The first burial took place on 22 July 1892. Gudmund Nyeland Brandt was gardener at the cemetery from 1901 to 1927. It was expanded in 1945.

== Chapel ==
The chapel was designed by Edvard Thomsen. The relief above the main entrance was created by Einar Utzon-Frank.

== Buildings ==
The chapel was designed by Andreas Clemmensen and completed in 1914. It has now been closed due to limited use.

== Notable interments ==
- Harald Agersnap
- Henning Ahrensborg
- Per Barfoed
- Viggo Barfoed
- Hilmar Baunsgaard
- Karina Bell
- Karen Berg
- Elisabeth Bergstrand-Poulsen
- Ingvar Blicher-Hansen
- Ester Boserup
- Mogens Boserup
- Zita Boye-Møller
- Gudmund Nyeland Brandt
- Viggo Brøndal
- Jens Byskov
- Erik Carlsen
- Aksel E. Christensen
- Aage Højland Christensen
- Carl Henrik Clemmensen
- S. Clod Svensson
- Ejner Federspiel
- Vilhelm H. Finsen
- Else Fischer
- Mogens Fog
- Erik Ellegaard Frederiksen
- Otto Gelsted
- Kai Ginsborg
- Christian Glarbo
- Norman Granz
- Ejner Graae
- Frederik Hegel
- Frederik V. Hegel
- Jacob Hegel
- Herman Heilbuth
- Otto Helms
- Frits Helmuth
- Osvald Helmuth
- Per Henriksen
- Louis Hjelmslev
- Einar Holbøll
- Andreas Holck
- Axel Holck
- Harry Hylén
- Arne Jacobsen
- C.P. Jürgensen
- Nina Kalckar
- Per Kampmann
- Sam Kaner
- Hans Kirk
- Jan Kjærulff
- Torben Krogh
- Karl Krøyer
- Bent Kæmpe
- Ronny Lerche
- Jens Lillelund
- Asger Lundbak
- Mouritz Mackeprang
- Ernst Mentze
- Ejnar Mikkelsen
- Carl Moltke
- Ebbe Munck
- Arvid Müller
- Peder Møller
- Preben Neergaard
- Arthur Nielsen
- Harald Nielsen
- Kurt 'Nikkelaj' Nielsen
- Lauritz Nielsen
- Marius Nyeboe
- Jørgen Olrik
- Tove Ólafsson
- Hans Parkov
- Knud Parkov
- Thorvald Pedersen
- Hans Gyde Petersen
- Clara Pontoppidan
- Axel Poulsen
- Agnete von Prangen
- Bjørn Puggaard-Müller
- Otto E. Ravn
- Charlotte Ernst Reichhardt
- Poul Reichhardt
- Sonja Rindom
- Johan Rohde
- Ruth Bryan Owen Rohde
- Volmer Rosenkilde
- Kristian Rørdam
- Frits Schlegel
- Svend S. Schultz
- Frederik Schyberg
- Robert Schyberg
- Erik Seidenfaden
- Tøger Seidenfaden
- Willy Skjold Burne
- J.F. Steffensen
- Jens Søndergaard
- Ejnar Thomassen
- Arnoff Thomsen
- Henry Ussing
- Helle Virkner
- T. Vogel-Jørgensen
- Karl Wedell-Wedellsborg
- Poul Wiedemann (unknown location)

== See also ==
- Ordrup Cemetery
- Hørsholm Cemetery
