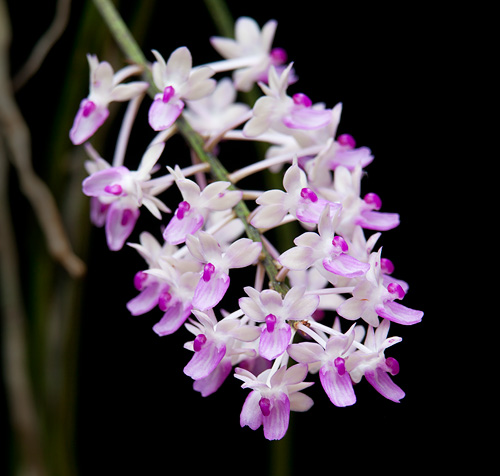

Scientific classification
- Kingdom: Plantae
- Clade: Embryophytes
- Clade: Tracheophytes
- Clade: Angiosperms
- Clade: Monocots
- Order: Asparagales
- Family: Orchidaceae
- Subfamily: Epidendroideae
- Tribe: Vandeae
- Subtribe: Aeridinae
- Genus: Seidenfadenia; Garay
- Species: S. mitrata

Binomial name
- Seidenfadenia mitrata (Rchb.f.) Garay

Synonyms
- Aerides mitrata Rchb.f.

= Seidenfadenia =

Genus of orchids

Seidenfadenia (abbreviated Sei.) is a genus of flowering plants from the orchid family, Orchidaceae.

Seidenfadenia and another orchid genus, Gunnarella, are named for Danish botanist Gunnar Seidenfaden. At present (June 2014), there is only one known species, Seidenfadenia mitrata, native to Thailand and to Myanmar (Burma). This species shows a pendent growth habit. The leaves are slender and succulent and reach lengths of up to 30 cm. The inflorescences are erect racemes or panicles with 17 to 52 pink or white flowers (average of 30). The inflorescences are usually shorter than the leaves. The most common flower morph shows pink colouration of the labellum and anther cap.

== See also ==
- List of Orchidaceae genera
