= Arthur Nielsen (disambiguation) =

Arthur Nielsen may refer to:

- Arthur Nielsen, American businessman, electrical engineer, and market research analyst who created the Nielsen ratings for television
- Arthur Nielsen (painter), Danish painter
- Arthur Nielsen (footballer), Danish footballer
