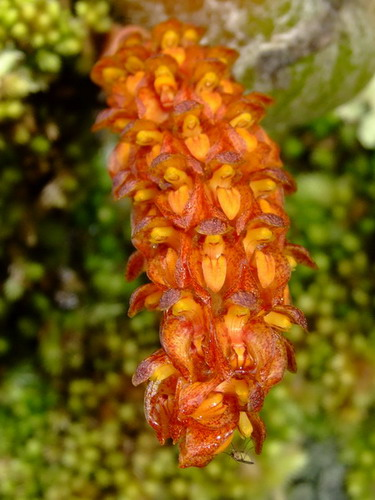

Scientific classification
- Kingdom: Plantae
- Clade: Tracheophytes
- Clade: Angiosperms
- Clade: Monocots
- Order: Asparagales
- Family: Orchidaceae
- Subfamily: Epidendroideae
- Genus: Bulbophyllum
- Species: B. wangkaense

Binomial name
- Bulbophyllum wangkaense Seidenf.

= Bulbophyllum wangkaense =

Species of orchid

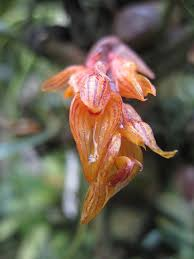
Single bulbophyllum wangkaense pseudobulb.

Bulbophyllum wangkaense is a species of orchid in the genus Bulbophyllum.

Found only in Thailand at elevations around 200 to 300 meters as a miniature to small sized, hot growing epiphyte with [4 cm] between each conical pseudobulb carrying a single, elliptic, minutely retuse apically leaf that blooms on an erect to arching 2 to 4" [5 to 10 cm] long, many flowered inflorescence that is sheathed in the lower half.
