= Bogoria matutina =

Scientific classification
- Kingdom: Plantae
- Clade: Tracheophytes
- Clade: Angiosperms
- Clade: Monocots
- Order: Asparagales
- Family: Orchidaceae
- Subfamily: Epidendroideae
- Genus: Bogoria
- Species: B. matutina

Binomial name
- Bogoria matutina (M.A.Clem. & D.L.Jones) D.L.Jones & M.A.Clem.

Synonyms
- Rhinerrhizopsis matutina D.L.Jones & M.A.Clem.

Species of orchid

Bogoria matutina, commonly known as the cupped freckle orchid, is an epiphytic orchid from the family Orchidaceae. It has thin, spreading roots, fibrous stems, between three and eight dark green, leathery leaves and up to fifty fragrant, short-lived, yellowish flowers with brown blotches and a white or yellowish labellum. It usually grows on rainforest trees and is found in tropical North Queensland, Australia.

== Description ==
Rhinerrhizopsis matutina is an epiphytic herb with a single main growth, thin, spreading roots, and a fibrous stem, 50–120 millimetres (2.0–4.7 in) long. There are between three and eight leathery, overlapping leaves 150–300 millimetres (5.9–12 in) long and 50–60 millimetres (2.0–2.4 in) wide that have pink to mauve markings. Between ten and fifty resupinate, tawny yellow flowers with brown blotches are arranged on an arching flowering stem 300–450 millimetres (12–18 in) long. The flowers are cup-shaped, 12–15 millimetres (0.47–0.59 in) long and wide and last for less than one day. The sepals and petals are spatula-shaped, the sepals 8–11 millimetres (0.31–0.43 in) long, 4–5 millimetres (0.16–0.20 in) wide and the petals 6–7 millimetres (0.24–0.28 in) long and 3–4 millimetres (0.12–0.16 in) wide. The labellum is white or yellowish, 5–6 millimetres (0.20–0.24 in) long, 3–4 millimetres (0.12–0.16 in) wide with three lobes. The side lobes are Scimitar-shaped and curve inwards and the middle lobe is small with a spur about 1.5 millimetres (0.059 in) long. Flowering occurs from July to September.

== Taxonomy and naming ==
The cupped freckle orchid was first formally described as Rhinerrhizopsis matutina in 2006 by David Jones and Mark Clements and the description was published in Australian Orchid Research. The specific epithet (matutina) is a Latin word meaning "of the morning" or "early", referring to the short-lived flowers. In 2019, Jones and Clements updated their description and classification, instead including the species in the genus Bogoria, recognized as heterotypic with Rhinerrhizopsis. The name Rhinerrhizopsis matutina is accepted at the Australian Plant Census.

== Distribution and habitat ==
Bogoria matutina grows on rainforest trees, especially near forest edges, streams and roadsides. It is found in the Iron and McIlwraith Ranges in tropical North Queensland.
