= Lao Ti =

Total population
- 200 (1998 figure)

Regions with significant populations
- Thailand

Languages
- Tai–Kadai, Kam–Tai, Be–Tai, Tai–Sek, Tai, Southwestern Tai, East Central Tai Lao–Phutai

Religion
- Buddhism

Lao Ti (Thai: ลาวตี้, pronounced [lāːw tîː]) also called Lao Di are an ethnic group of Ratchaburi Province in western Thailand near the Burma border. The group was first studied in 1939 by the Danish ethnologist Erik Seidenfaden.
