= Gudmund Nyeland Brandt =

Danish architect

Gudmund Nyeland Brandt (17 March 1878 in Frederiksberg – 30 April 1945 in Kessel-lo) was a Danish landscape architect who was internationally renowned.

== Career ==
Brandt was born at Frederiksberg, Denmark. His father, Peter Christoffer Brandt, was a gardener, bank manager and parish bailiff in Ordrup, Denmark. His mother was Anna Kirstine Nyeland. He graduated from Ordrup Gymnasium 1897 and earned a M.A. in Philosophy the following year. Then he was trained as a gardener by trade gardener N. Jensen, Valby 1899–1901, was in England 1901-02 and at the Jardin des plantes, Paris 1902. He came to Germany in 1903 and was later in Belgium.

He was first employed by his father at P. Brandt commercial horticulture at Ørnekulsvej 3 (former Ellensvej) Ordrup in 1904. He took over the business in 1906 (sold 1914), and the same year he became a gardener for the municipality of Gentofte. He was at a dig in Ordrup Cemetery 1910-27 (partly brought on his horticultural land around his house, official residence in 1914). He was editor of Gardener Journal of Denmark (Gartner-Tidende) 1905-7 and secretary of General Gardener Association of Denmark (Almindelig Gartnerforening), consultant for the municipality of Gentofte in park issues 1921, member for the publication of Danish Manor House Gardens (Danske Herregaardshaver) and The Royal Danish Garden Society (Det Kongelige Danske Haveselskab), 1924–28.

He was a lecturer in garden design at the Danish Academy of Fine Arts (Kunstakademiets Arkitektskole) 1924–41, city and municipal gardener in Gentofte Municipality 1927-45 and member of the academy (Akademiraadets) Committee for gardening 1942–45. He received the Eckersberg Medal 1937 and the C.F. Hansen Medal 1945.

He exhibited at the Artists' Autumn Exhibition of 1918, Charlottenborg Spring Exhibition in 1918, 1920 and 1945 (retrospective). He found inspiration in trips to Scandinavia, Germany, the Netherlands, France, Italy, and Algiers, the 1939.

On 1 April 1909 in Copenhagen, Brandt married Gerda Petersen (14 October 1880 in Valby - 22 August 1941 in Gentofte), daughter of commerce gardener Emil Frederick Daniel Petersen and Marie Caroline Elisabeth Clément. He died at Kessel-Lo, Belgium and was buried at Ordrup Cemetery in Copenhagen.

== Works ==
- Own garden, Ordrup
- Hellerup Strandpark, Hellerup (1912–18)
- French Soldiers' Grave, Helsingør Cemetery (1914–18)
- Øregårdsparken (redesign), Hellerup (1918)
- Marienlyst Gardens (redesign), Helsingør (1919–20)
- Historic–Botanical Gardens, Vordingborg (1921)
- Ordrup Cemetery (partial redesign and extension), Gentofte (1920–30)
- Courtyard garden complex, the Hornbækhus block, Ågade, Copenhagen (1923)
- Randers State School gardens, Randers (1923)
- Grønnegården, Danish Museum of Art & Design, Copenhagen (1923–24, protected 2008)
- Søndermark Cemetery, Frederiksberg, Copenhagen (1929)
- Mariebjerg Cemetery, Gentofte (1926–36)
- Makiri, Villa Garden to Villa Nympha for Helge Jacobsen (Makiri, villahave til Villa Nympha for Helge Jacobsen), Fredheimsvej 9, Vedbæk (1930–31)
- Bernstorff Allotments, Jaegersborg, Jægersborg (1931)
- Danserindebrønden complex, Helsingør (1933)
- Construction of the zoo (Nyanlæg i Zoologisk Have), Roskildevej, Frederiksberg (ca. 1934)
- Solbakken allotments, Copenhagen (1935)
- Radiohuset roof gardens, Frederiksberg, Copenhagen (1940–41, expanded by J. Palle Schmidt 1956–57)
- University Park (Universitetsparken), at the University of Copenhagen's North Campus, Copenhagen (1940–41)
- Fountain Terrace, Tivoli Gardens, Copenhagen (1943) Tivoli fountain terrace (1943)
