= Bulbophyllum cariniflorum =

Scientific classification
- Kingdom: Plantae
- Clade: Tracheophytes
- Clade: Angiosperms
- Clade: Monocots
- Order: Asparagales
- Family: Orchidaceae
- Subfamily: Epidendroideae
- Genus: Bulbophyllum
- Species: B. cariniflorum

Binomial name
- Bulbophyllum cariniflorum Rchb.f.

Synonyms
- Bulbophyllum birmense Schltr. 1910

Species of orchid

Bulbophyllum cariniflorum is a species of orchid in the genus Bulbophyllum.
