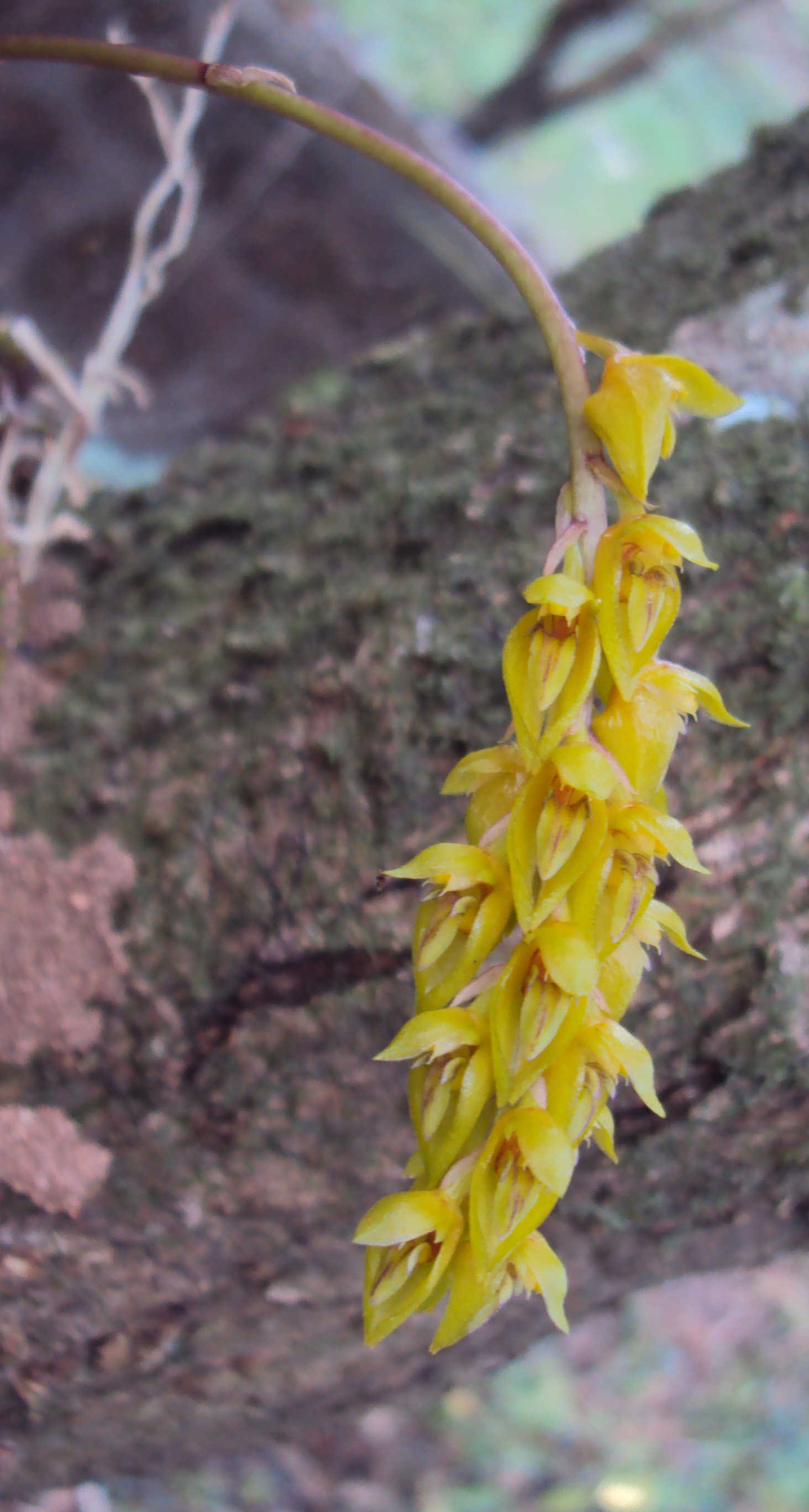

Scientific classification
- Kingdom: Plantae
- Clade: Tracheophytes
- Clade: Angiosperms
- Clade: Monocots
- Order: Asparagales
- Family: Orchidaceae
- Subfamily: Epidendroideae
- Genus: Bulbophyllum
- Species: B. sterile

Binomial name
- Bulbophyllum sterile (Lam.) Suresh

Synonyms
- Bulbophyllum caudatum Lindl.; Bulbophyllum nilgherrense Wight; Epidendrum sterile Lam.; Phyllorchis caudata (Lindl.) Kuntze; Phyllorkis caudata (Lindl.) Kuntze; Phyllorkis nilgherensis (Wight) Kuntze

= Bulbophyllum sterile =

Species of orchid

Bulbophyllum sterile is a species of orchid in the genus Bulbophyllum. The native range of this species is Nepal to Southern India and Myanmar. It is a pseudobulbous epiphyte with yellow flowers, and grows primarily in the wet tropical biome.
