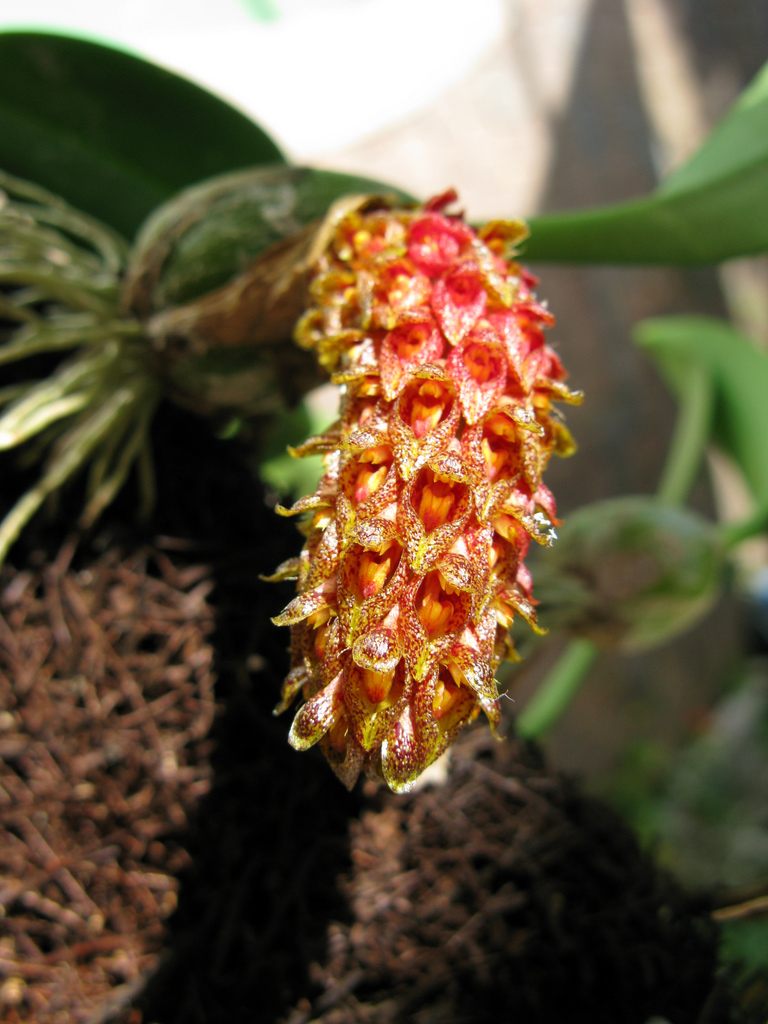

Scientific classification
- Kingdom: Plantae
- Clade: Tracheophytes
- Clade: Angiosperms
- Clade: Monocots
- Order: Asparagales
- Family: Orchidaceae
- Subfamily: Epidendroideae
- Genus: Bulbophyllum
- Species: B. crassipes

Binomial name
- Bulbophyllum crassipes Hook.f. (1890)

Synonyms
- Phyllorkis crassipes (Hook.f.) Kuntze (1891); Bulbophyllum careyanum var. crassipes (Hook.f.) Pradhan (1979)

= Bulbophyllum crassipes =

Thick-spurred bulbophyllum

Species of orchid

Bulbophyllum crassipes (thick-spurred bulbophyllum) is a species of orchid.
