= Snu Abecassis =

Danish-Portuguese publisher (1940-1980)

- Born: Ebba Merete Seidenfaden; 7 October 1940; Copenhagen, Denmark
- Died: 4 December 1980 (aged 40); Camarate, Lisbon District, Portugal
- Citizenship: Denmark; Portugal
- Occupation: Publisher
- Employer: Publicações Dom Quixote
- Spouse: Alberto Vasco Abecassis (m. 1961, divorced)
- Partner: Francisco Sá Carneiro
- Children: 3
- Father: Erik Seidenfaden

Ebba Merete "Snu" Abecassis (born Ebba Merete Seidenfaden; 7 October 1940 – 4 December 1980) was a Danish-Portuguese publisher, who founded Publicações Dom Quixote, a publishing house that became famous for publishing left-wing works, associated with ideas contrary to the dictatorship of the Estado Novo.

== Biography ==
Daughter of the Danish journalists Erik Seidenfaden and Jytte Kaastrup-Olsen, Ebba Merete was born in Copenhagen on 7 October 1940. As a child she was given the nickname Snu, which means "smart" in Danish.

In 1961, she married Alberto Vasco Abecassis. She moved to Portugal after a year and the couple's three children were born there. In 1965, under her direction, the publishing house Publicações Dom Quixote was founded in Lisbon. The company published both left-wing literary works and non-fiction, with a focus on those that were challenging to Portuguese political authority, or were as yet unpublished in Portuguese. It was the first to publish Pippi Longstocking and Alexander Solzhenitsyn in Portugal, as well as the first to publish The Two Cultures by C P Snow.

Francisco Sá Carneiro was a Portuguese politician with whom Abecassis had an affair. She divorced her husband, but Sá Carneiro was unable to obtain a divorce from his wife. Despite this, they began to live together and also died together on 4 December 1980, in the Camarate air crash, which, in addition to Snu and Sá Carneiro, killed Adelino Amaro da Costa. The three were heading to a rally for the end of António Soares Carneiro's presidential campaign. It has been speculated that the crash was the result of an assassination attempt, but no group was prosecuted.

== Cultural legacy ==
The film SNU was released in 2019, directed by Patrícia Sequeira; it was the second most popular national release of the year. Abecassis also featured in the series, 3 Mulheres, first aired on 26 October 2018, which told the story of her life alongside that of Maria Armanda Falcão and Natália Correia.

In 2011 Cândida Pinto published a biography titled Snu, which was translated into Danish in 2013. In 2010, the final minute of Abecassis' life was the subject of a play, which premiered at the Casafez theatre in Lisbon. Published in 2003, Abecassis' mother wrote a biography of her daughter six years after her death. In 2024, Danish author Mikkel Stolt published the novel, "Pendulet i Portugal", in which the fictional character 'Fifi' (a word play on the word 'snu', both meaning 'smart' in Danish) is based on Snu Abecassis.

Elizabeth Hera Garton hybridised an orchid and named it Snu after Abecassis.

On 6 July 2026, a street named after Snu Abecassis in Lisbon's Lumiar district, inaugurated by the mayor of Lisbon, Carlos Moedas, in the presence of former President of the Portuguese Republic Marcelo Rebelo de Sousa. The latter invited at the ceremony as a friend of Abecassis, said she brought “color and light” to a Portugal still closed in on itself. Identifying her as a “rebellious pioneer,” Marcelo stated that Snu “founded democracy before it was founded,” by promoting freedom of thought. He also said that the regime never knew how to deal with a woman who responded to censorship simply by republishing seized books. Whenever a work was banned, Abecassis found a way to return it to bookstores. Marcelo also recalled that Abecassis bothered not only the regime but also part of the opposition, precisely because she refused to conform to any political orthodoxy.
