= Bulbophyllum triste =

Scientific classification
- Kingdom: Plantae
- Clade: Tracheophytes
- Clade: Angiosperms
- Clade: Monocots
- Order: Asparagales
- Family: Orchidaceae
- Subfamily: Epidendroideae
- Genus: Bulbophyllum
- Species: B. triste

Binomial name
- Bulbophyllum triste Rchb. f.

Synonyms
- Phyllorkis tristis (Rchb.f.) Kuntze 1891; Bulbophyllum alopecurus Rchb.f. 1880; Bulbophyllum mackeeanum Guillaumin 1962; Bulbophyllum micranthum Hook.f. 1890; Phyllorkis alopecurus (Rchb.f.) Kuntze 1891

Species of orchid

Bulbophyllum triste is a species of orchid in the genus Bulbophyllum.
