= Bulbophyllum reichenbachii =

Scientific classification
- Kingdom: Plantae
- Clade: Tracheophytes
- Clade: Angiosperms
- Clade: Monocots
- Order: Asparagales
- Family: Orchidaceae
- Subfamily: Epidendroideae
- Genus: Bulbophyllum
- Species: B. reichenbachii

Binomial name
- Bulbophyllum reichenbachii (Kuntze) Schltr.

Synonyms
- Bulbophyllum gracile E.C.Parish & Rchb.f. [illegitimate]; Phyllorkis reichenbachii Kuntze

Species of orchid

Bulbophyllum reichenbachii is a species of orchid in the genus Bulbophyllum, found in northern Burma. The orchid grows on the trunks of trees, forming clumps.
