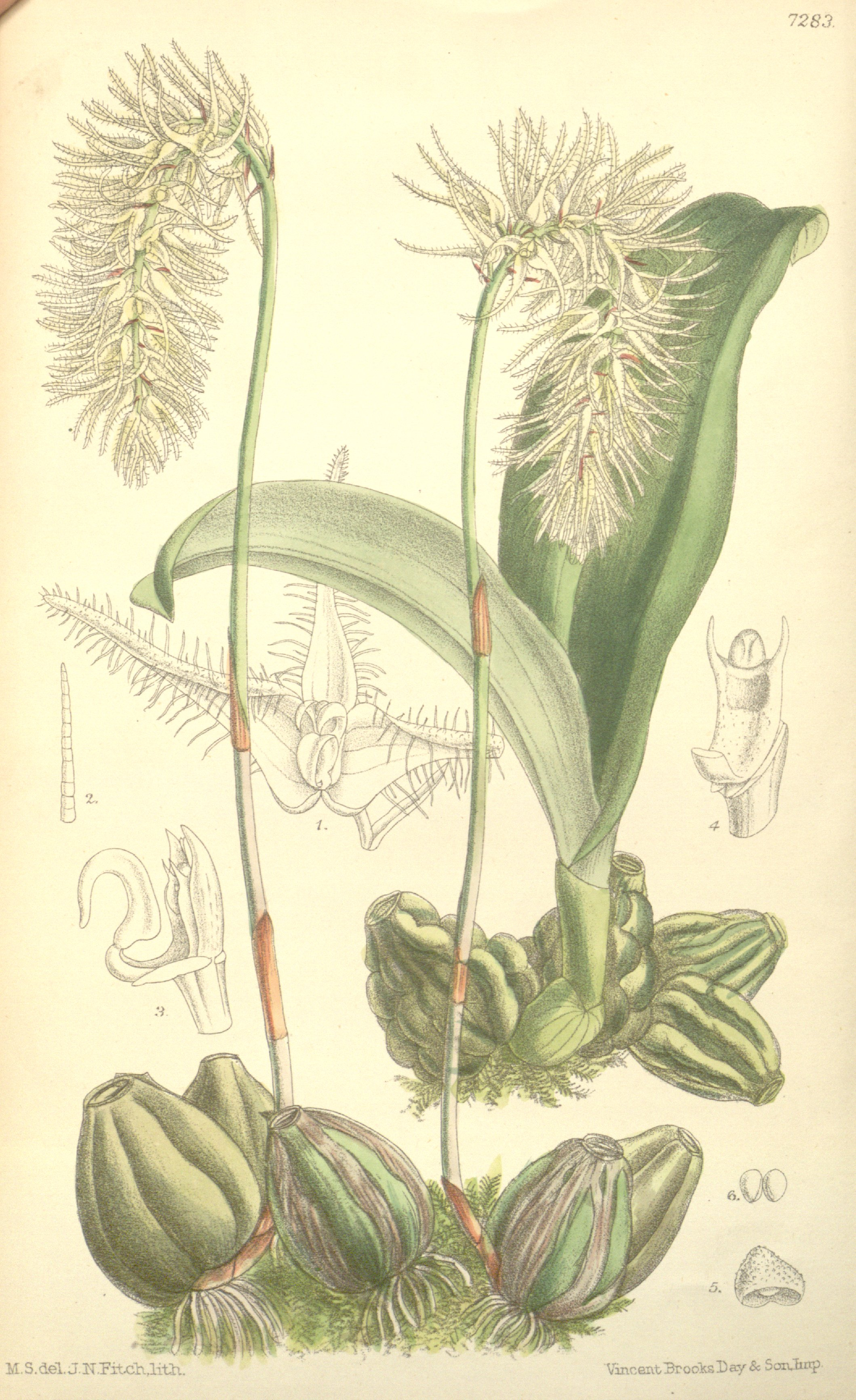

Scientific classification
- Kingdom: Plantae
- Clade: Tracheophytes
- Clade: Angiosperms
- Clade: Monocots
- Order: Asparagales
- Family: Orchidaceae
- Subfamily: Epidendroideae
- Genus: Bulbophyllum
- Species: B. comosum

Binomial name
- Bulbophyllum comosum Collett & Hemsl.

Synonyms
- Phyllorkis comosa (Collett & Hemsl.) Kuntze (1891)

= Bulbophyllum comosum =

Species of orchid

Bulbophyllum comosum is a species of flowering plant in the family Orchidaceae.
