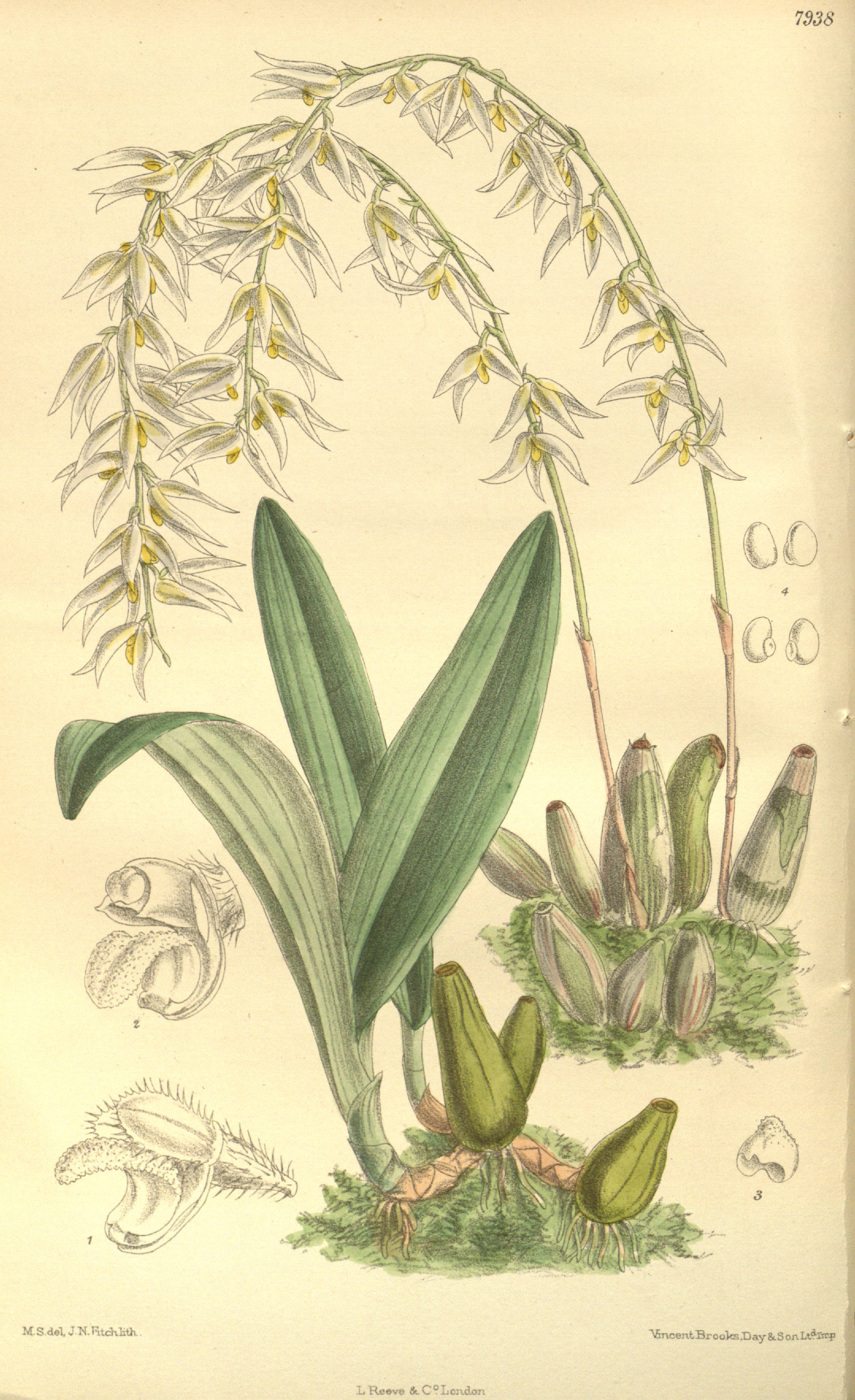

Scientific classification
- Kingdom: Plantae
- Clade: Tracheophytes
- Clade: Angiosperms
- Clade: Monocots
- Order: Asparagales
- Family: Orchidaceae
- Subfamily: Epidendroideae
- Genus: Bulbophyllum
- Species: B. auricomum

Binomial name
- Bulbophyllum auricomum Lindl. (1830)

Synonyms
- Dendrobium tripetaloides Roxb. (1832); Bulbophyllum foenisecii E.C.Parish ex Rchb.f. (1865); Phyllorkis auricoma (Lindl.) Kuntze (1891); Bulbophyllum tripetaloides (Roxb.) Schltr. (1914)

= Bulbophyllum auricomum =

Species of orchid from Southeast Asia

Bulbophyllum auricomum is a species of orchid in the genus Bulbophyllum. It is endemic to the low-elevation forests of Southeast Asia, specifically Burma/Myanmar, Thailand, and the Indonesian islands of Sumatra and Java. Its fragrant flowers open in late fall to early winter. The inflorescence consists of a many-flowered nodding raceme about 22 centimetres (8.7 in) long.
