= Arthur Nielsen (painter) =

Danish painter

Arthur Nielsen (10 July 1883, Odense – 11 April 1946, Klampenborg) was a Danish artist. His tutor was Henrik Dohm (from 1909 to 1911). He studied and traveled in (Germany), Austria and Italy. Arthur Nielsen was a co-founder of the Association of the Deer Park artists in 1913. His grave is in Ordrup Cemetery.

== Exhibitions ==
- The Deer Park painters from 1913.
- Art association of 18 November 1923–24, 1926–27, 1930, 1932–36, 1932–36, 1940–42.
- Charlottenborg Spring Exhibition 1934.
- The Independent (Den Frie) 1918
- Charlottenborg 1936.
- Aarhus Art Association 1937 together with numerous other censured art exhibitions.

== Style ==
Arthur Nielsen is known for his beautiful paintings of Danish landscapes and he worked the last 10 years (from 1936 to 1946) with large surfaces and applied the paint by means of a filling knife and scraped his signature in the wet paint. His paintings hold the essence of the particular light and colours of the seasons of the year.
