= Bulbophyllum rufilabrum =

Scientific classification
- Kingdom: Plantae
- Clade: Tracheophytes
- Clade: Angiosperms
- Clade: Monocots
- Order: Asparagales
- Family: Orchidaceae
- Subfamily: Epidendroideae
- Genus: Bulbophyllum
- Species: B. rufilabrum

Binomial name
- Bulbophyllum rufilabrum C. S. P. Parish ex Hook. f.

Species of orchid

Bulbophyllum rufilabrum is a species of orchid in the genus Bulbophyllum. Its common name is 'The Fox Red Lip Bulbophyllum.' The Bulbophyllum rufilabrum flowers in October and November in the Indo-China region. The flower is 0.3 cm wide and 0.5 cm high. It is made up of three peddles, the outer two forming an open pod shape with a third, red peddle, in the center. The blooms form clusters on the end of the orchid's spikes (stems).
