= Bogoria (plant) =

Scientific classification
- Kingdom: Plantae
- Clade: Tracheophytes
- Clade: Angiosperms
- Clade: Monocots
- Order: Asparagales
- Family: Orchidaceae
- Subfamily: Epidendroideae
- Tribe: Vandeae
- Subtribe: Aeridinae
- Genus: Bogoria; J.J. Sm.

Type species
- Bogoria raciborskii J.J.Sm.

Synonyms
- Gunnarella Senghas; Rhinerrhizopsis Ormerod

Genus of orchids

Bogoria moorei illustration

Bogoria is a genus of epiphytic orchids native to insular Southeast Asia (Borneo, Java, Sumatra, New Guinea and the Philippines). Plants of the World Online accepts 14 species of Bogoria as at September 2024:

- Bogoria beccarii (Rchb.f.) M.A.Clem. & D.L.Jones – P.N.G.
- Bogoria carinata (J.J.Sm.) M.A.Clem. & D.L.Jones – P.N.G.
- Bogoria godeffroyana (Rchb.f.) R.Rice – Fiji
- Bogoria gracile (Schltr.) M.A.Clem. & D.L.Jones – P.N.G.
- Bogoria laxus (Schltr.) M.A.Clem. & D.L.Jones – P.N.G.
- Bogoria matutina (D.L.Jones & M.A.Clem.) M.A.Clem. & D.L.Jones – Queensland
- Bogoria merrillii (Ames) Garay - Philippines
- Bogoria moorei (Rchb.f.) M.A.Clem. & D.L.Jones – P.N.G., Queensland
- Bogoria nambana (B.A.Lewis) M.A.Clem. & D.L.Jones - Vanuatu
- Bogoria papuana Schltr. - P.N.G., Sulawesi
- Bogoria raciborskii J.J.Sm. - Java + Borneo
- Bogoria ramuana (Kraenzl.) M.A.Clem. & D.L.Jones – Bismarck Archipelago
- Bogoria robertsii (Schltr.) M.A.Clem. & D.L.Jones – New Caledonia, Vanuatu
- Bogoria taeniorhiza (Schltr.) Schltr. - Sumatra
