= Erik Seidenfaden (ethnologist) =

Danish ethnologist and anthropologist (1881–1958)

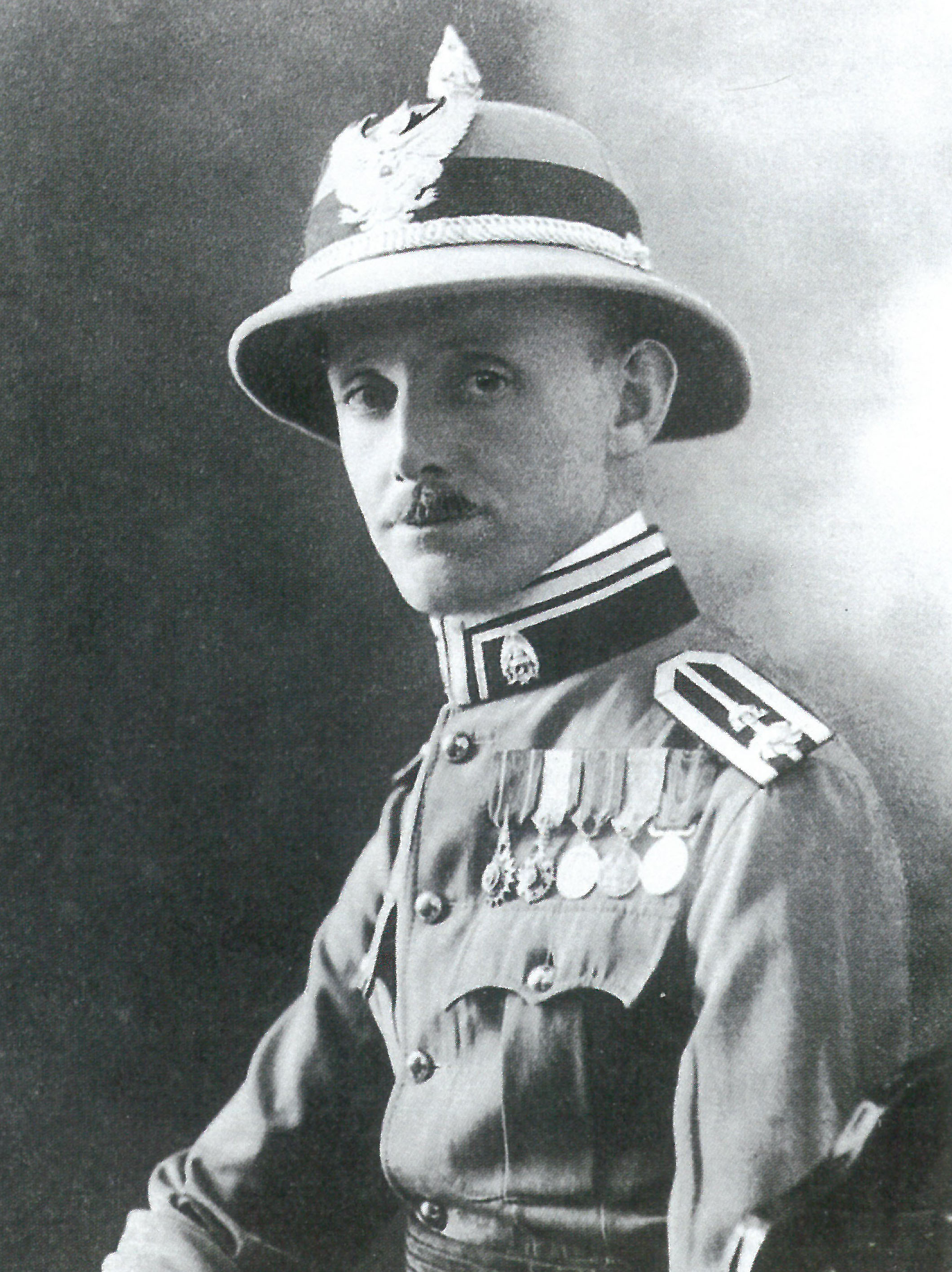
- Erik Seidenfaden in Siam
- Born: 1881; Copenhagen, Denmark
- Died: 1958 (aged 76–77)
- Occupation: Ethnologist

Major Erik Seidenfaden (Thai: อีริค ไซเดนฟาเดน; 1881–1958) was a Danish Captain of The Royal Siamese Gendarmerie who lived in Thailand from 1906 to 1947. He served as part of the Provincial Gendarmerie where his role was to assist with the modernization of the Siamese military. He played an active role in the Siam Society as an amateur ethnologist who authored books and articles on the history, culture and languages of the Thai peoples. Anthropologist Herbert Phillips of the University of California, Berkeley, claimed that Seidenfaden "probably had more first-hand knowledge of the culture and history of the Thai and related peoples than did any other European of this century," whose ethnological interpretations nonetheless amounted to "informed prejudice."

Seidenfaden in Siam, c. 1911

== Life ==
Seidenfaden was born in 1881 in Copenhagen, Denmark, the son of civil engineer Frederik Julius Seidenfaden (1839–1899) and Emmy Margrethe Jacobine Philipsen (1852–1920). He took a preliminary exam at Copenhagen university in 1898, but then went on to study farming at Estruplund. Then he joined an army school, and became junior lieutenant in 1903, serving in the infantry. Moving on to officer school, he took the opportunity offered then to move to Thailand (at the time known as Siam) in 1906, joining The Royal Siamese Gendarmerie, the provincial military police force, rising to the rank of captain in 1907 and to major in 1914.

In April 1907, after Siam was forced by the French to give up on the regions of Battambang, Srisophon and Siemrep in Cambodia, Captain Erik Seidenfaden was put in charge of nine huge convoys moving the Siamese Governor-general Phraya Chhum Abhaiwongse Kathathom (1861–1922) and his belongings out. The Governor-general's extended and very numerous family - the Aphaiwongs were of royal Khmer lineage - included 44 concubines and 50 children. The convoy included 37 elephants, 26 of them carrying the Governor-general's daughters and dancers. The convoy, which travelled 300 kilometres west under constant rains consisted of 1,700 ox carts, of which 1,350 requisitioned from the local farmers of Prachinburi in Siam, their final destination, took three months. Apart from herds of cattle, oxen, sheep and 3 Axis deer, it included a number of Australian horses. Convoy n.2 consisted of 215 ox carts carrying the valuables, including 1.8m silver piastres, equivalent to 18m French Francs or 1.1bn Thai Baht (2012). Apart from the Governor-general's life guard of 40 men, armed with rifles and swords, Seidenfaden had 100 gendarmes with him, many if not most Danish, many suffering from cholera and beriberi, and a gang of robbers was said to be at the heels of the convoy.

In 1914 he became the chief of The Royal Siamese Gendarmerie's officer school. His role, along with that of many imported western officers, was to assist with the modernization of the Siamese military. He had also married Malé Maria Praivichitr Emdeng (1892–1973), with whom he had several children.

In 1920 he demobilized and became chief of the accounting department of the Thai Electric Corporation Ltd., where he remained until 1941, retiring in Bangkok. Only in 1947 he returned with his family to Denmark, settling in Sorgenfri by Lyngby, north of the capital. In 1927 Seidenfaden wrote a Guide to Bangkok for the Royal State Railway Department., which was reprinted several times, including in 1984 by Oxford University Press, as it had become a standard work describing many of Thailand's buddhist temples. His older brother of Aage Valdemar Seidenfaden (1877–1966) had gone on to become chief constable of Copenhagen.

== Siam Society ==
Seidenfaden was a President (1937–1941) and Honorary Member (1947) of the Siam Society and he wrote a large number of articles, papers and reviews for the Journal of the Siam Society, which are now available online. In 1937, he organized an exhibition of ethic dress in the lecture hall of the Siam Society. The exhibition sought to include all the traditional, national costumes of the many branches of the Thai people which Seidenfaden noticed were fast disappearing often to be replaced by more modern fashions.

== Research and influence ==
Despite having no formal scholarly training, he was an "enthusiastic amateur ethnographer” and a pioneer of Thai studies, which saw him examine and document national and regional ethnicity as well as work to preserve these disappearing cultures.

Having noticed "with sorrow, how the pictoresque and time-honoured national and regional costumes, nearly all over the land, are fast disappearing, to be replaced by dresses of more or less international fashion" in 1937 in the lecture hall of the Siam Society he inaugurated an exhibition collecting the costumes of the various branches of the Thai peoples and of the non-Thai communities, mostly in the North-east of the country. He saw material objects as a primary cause for the loss of ethnic diversity and in his writing discussed the negative and "corrupting" effects of objects such as radios, movies, cinematograph, gramophones, and trucks. In particular, he blamed radio for the vanishing of age-old dialects, manners and cultural traditions. He commented that the "honk of the motor lorry with its load of cheap foreign textiles sounds the death knell of the national costumes".

While he was serving as deputy to the Inspector-General of the Royal Siamese Gendarmerie and during the visits to the outlying provinces and gendarmerie stations between 1908 and 1919 Seidenfaden visited and re-discovered a number of archeologically significant Buddhist temples. He learnt local dialects too, and collected knowledge of local customs which was quite extraordinary.

In 1939, he was the first person to study the Lao Ti people, an ethnic group in Ratchaburi Province.

His nephew Gunnar Seidenfaden also had ties to Thailand, where he researched and identified many new Orchid species, naming some too, as well as serving as a Danish ambassador for Bangkok (Thailand) and Manila (Philippines) in 1955, Rangoon (Burma) and Phnom Pehn (Cambodia) in 1956 and Vientiane (Laos) in 1957.

Erik Seidenfaden was awarded the knighthood of the Siamese Crown Order in 1912, in 1926 the order of the Crown of Thailand, in 1932 the Danish knighthood of Dannebrog, as well as knighted with the Siamese Order of the White Elephant.

His extensive library of Thai books was in 2004 donated by his daughter Grethe Seidenfaden (1929–2012) to The Thai Section, Department of Cross-Cultural and Regional Studies, University of Copenhagen.

== Selected publications ==
- Guide to Bangkok, with notes on Siam, 1927
- The Thai peoples, 1958
- The Thai peoples. Book 1, The origins and habitats of the Thai peoples, with a sketch of their material and spiritual culture, 1958
