= Erik Seidenfaden (journalist) =

Danish journalist

Erik Seidenfaden (24 April 1910 – 13 April 1990) was a Danish journalist and editor. He was a co-founder of the Danish newspaper Dagbladet Information.

== Early life ==
Erik Seidenfaden was born in Hasle, Denmark. He was the son of district attorney and Copenhagen’s chief constable Aage Valdemar Seidenfaden (1877–1966) and Anna Elise Reenberg Teilman Harck (1887–1928). He was a brother of diplomat and botanist Gunnar Seidenfaden (1908–2001). In 1928, Seidenfaden took the classical languages exam at Sorø Akademi and went on to study comparative literature at Copenhagen University. In Paris, (Sorbonne) he attended a journalism school and, after considering a career in literature studies.

== Career ==
=== Early career ===
Erik Seidenfaden began working as an assistant to Nicolaj Blædel (1882–1943), foreign correspondent at the daily Dagens Nyheder Later, in 1945, Seidenfaden would edit and publish Blædel's work Forbrydelse og Dumhed. His first significant reporting job came when he was sent to cover Adolf Hitler's 1933 election campaign, where he was almost arrested writing against Nazi Germany. He began his series on Germany with a satirical article, published on 18 June 1933, which was about the "nazification" of Heidelberg University titled "200 Dueller om Ugen I Heidelberg". He then published "Jødehaderen", an interview with the Julius Streicher (1885–1946). Nazi and vehement anti-Semitic editor of Der Stürmer at a coffee house in Nuremberg.

In 1935, he became the permanent foreign correspondent for Dagens Nyheder, working within the newsroom of The Times. He soon followed Nicolaj Blædel to the more conservative Berlingske Tidende and Jydske Tidende until 1937. When the Spanish Civil War broke out in July 1936, he compiled reports from the front on the government's side, in 1937 publishing the book Borgerkrig i Spanien.

He then returned to Denmark and joined the left leaning newspaper Politiken as a foreign editor in 1937. His militant attitude towards the Nazi threat often clashed with that of the influential social liberal Det Radikale Venstre party and the views of the several times foreign minister Erik Scavenius (1877–1962), and chairman of the board of Politiken. In an article titled Indre Frihed i Pant for Ydre published for the journal Kulturkampen in December 1937, written by him but signed by Peter Rohde (1902–1978), Erik Seidenfaden attacked the appeasing line of the government led by the social democratic prime minister Thorvald Stauning (1873-1942) and the foreign minister Peter Munch (1870-1948).

=== Second World War ===
When Denmark was invaded on 9 April 1940, Erik Seidenfaden was in Oslo reporting on the Allied minefield laying operations in Norwegian waters. After the German invasion, he then reached the front by Trondheim via Sweden but after the retreat of the Anglo-French expeditionary force, he returned to Copenhagen. He told the editor in chief of Politiken that he had joined the News Chronicle, and agreed to stay only after being offered a post as a correspondent in Rome to cover neutral Italy. After Italy entered the war in early June 1940 he returned to Denmark and began becoming active in illegal circles which, apart from Nicolaj Blædel, included the journalists Merete Bonnesen (1901-1980), Jens Søltoft-Jensen (1906-1964), Sten Gudme (1901-1961), the Gyldendal publisher Ingeborg Andersen (1887-1960), the philologist Lis Jacobsen (1882-1961), the physicist Niels Bohr (1885-1962) and his brother mathematician Harald Bohr (1887-1951), the Politiken board member Herman Dedichen (1896-1958) and the jura professor Stephan Hurwitz (1901-1981).

When the British military intelligence organization SOE-Special Operations Executive in their first mission in Denmark dropped parachutists Carl Johan Bruhn (1904–1941) and Mogens Hammer (1911–1946) by Haslev on 27 December 1941, they were given two contacts who, it was believed, would be prepared to assist them. The first of the contacts declined all help, but Seidenfaden did what he could to assist them and made arrangements to feed and assist them in order to enter the resistance circles. Sensing in September 1942 that he might get caught, in January 1943 Seidenfaden managed to be sent to Stockholm as a correspondent for Politiken. There, he forged contacts with the journalist and resistance organizer Ebbe Munck (1905–1974) and Sten Gudme, who in June 1941 left for London as a representative of the Danish resistance. In Stockholm, he was soon active in establishing a network of underground news informers in Denmark, with the help of his brother Gunnar Seidenfaden who worked in the Foreign Ministry, and his father, who at the time was the chief constable of Copenhagen's northern district.

He tried to explain to the Allies the situation in occupied Denmark, where the sitting government wasn't a puppet but behaved like one. A situation which he later described in the book Hitler Beskyddar Denmark, published in Autumn 1943 under the pseudonym of Erik Ring in Stockholm by Tor Bonnier (1883–1976) at Albert Bonniers Förlag, which in an abridged version was illegally distributed in occupied Denmark. In Stockholm, he forged close ties to the SOE-Special Operations Executive chief Ronald Turnbull (1914–2004) and became an SOE agent n.4388 with the rank of officer.

Among the many Danes who flocked to the neutral Swedish capital and consolidated friendships were the writer and architect Poul Henningsen (1894–1967) and the journalist and writer Erling Bjøl (1918-). Among the Swedes in their circles, belonged writers like Eyvind Johnson (1900–1976) and Harry Martinsson (1904–1978). On 29 August 1943 the Germans took total administrative control of Denmark and, with Ebbe Munck, Seidenfaden established the news agency Dansk Presse Tjeneste, with paid staff servicing Swedish, British and American newspapers, radio stations and news agencies. The intelligence from Denmark, via DPT, involved several telegrams a day containing very valuable information, which also found its way to the BBC broadcasts directed at Denmark, where the censored local press did not carry stories which reflected negatively on the Nazi occupiers. Other beneficiaries were the SOE organisation, as well as the PWE, the Political Warfare Executive, which dealt with propaganda. The DPT service was particularly useful during the general strike in Copenhagen in July 1944, when all power was cut, nor the local press nor the Danish radio operated. As the Danish resistance movement gained strength and its activities became more incisive, he became involved in its decision-making, and repeatedly travelled to Denmark for negotiations with the Danish Freedom Council (Danmarks Frihedsråd).

=== Post Second World War ===
After the liberation in May 1945, the board of Politiken sought to appoint him as its editor, to distance themselves from an arguably collaborationist stance during the occupation. However, the newspaper's staff, loyal to Niels Hasager (1888–1969) who had led them since 1931, blocked it. In October 1945, with Sten Gudme, Seidenfaden started the foreign policy magazine Fremtiden to which he remained associated until 1968. He then joined forces with Børge Outze (1912–1980), who had taken over the German-friendly printing press of Fædrelandet to publish the daily Dagbladet Information. Both worked together for twenty years, in an association which influenced Danish press for its opinions, style, political independence and open debates. Many of their editorials were collected in the 1948 book Spidser. Information and Erik Seidenfaden probably exerted the strongest influence in the fields of defence and foreign policy, and his campaign for Denmark joining NATO in 1949 had crucial impact. But the newspaper was not pro-American all the time. Indeed, when its reporter Elsa Gress followed very critically phenomenon of McCarthysm in 1952 and 1954, Erik Seidenfaden gave a very unflattering presentation of McCarthy's career and even concluded by expressing the pious hope that somebody would eliminate the senator.

=== Later career ===
As a writer, lecturer and correspondent on the radio, he consistently advocated Denmark's position in the Western world and the European Community. His list of foreign policy writings include a book about Israel, Den hellige krig om det hellige land (1956), Atomvåbnene og udenrigspolitiken (1958), Luft mellem magtblokkene? (1959) and Vejene til Europa (1970). Between 1965-75 he served as a member of the London-based Council of the International Institute for Strategic Studies, and in 1976 of the Trilateral Commission. He was also a member of Det Udenrigspolitiske Selskab, a Danish foreign policy club.

In 1965, he moved to Paris as the director of the Danish student house. There he initially worked as a correspondent for Information, but considering the paper to have become too left-wing for his liberal views, in 1967 he began to write for Berlingske Tidende. In 1980, again as a correspondent, he returned to Politiken and from 1975 worked for the Danish broadcasting company. His last book was Frederiksholm's Kanal og Verdenshavet (1982). At the end of WWII, he was awarded a British MBE. In 1974 he was awarded knighthood in the Dannebrog and in 1982 first degree.

== Personal life ==
Seidenfaden married journalist Jytte Kaastrup Olsen (1913–2007) in 1935 in London and had two children: Annelise Kaastrup Seidenfaden (1937-) and Ebba Merete Seidenfaden (1940–1980), also known as Snu Abecassis, founder of the Publicações Dom Quixote publishing house and life partner of Portuguese prime minister Francisco Sá Carneiro. He married for the second time to the minister Lone Knutzon (1923–1978), with whom he had one child, Tøger Seidenfaden (1957–2011), who would later become editor-in-chief of Politiken.

Seidenfaden died in 1990 and was buried in Ordrup Cemetery in Copenhagen, Denmark.

== Other Sources ==
- Erik Seidenfaden. En biografi, by Gerhardt Eriksen, Spektum, 2000;
- British broadcasting and the Danish resistance movement, 1940-1945: a study of the Wartime Broadcasts of the B.B.C. Danish Service, by Jeremy Bennett, Cambridge University Press 2010;
- Kontakt med England 1940-43, by Jørgen Hæstrup, Thaning og Appels, 1954;
- Hemmelig alliance I-II-III, by Jørgen Hæstrup, Thaning og Appels, 1959;
- Kampen om Danmark 1933-1945, Bo Lidegaard, Gyldendal, 2006;
- Gylne Tider, i Skyggen af Outze og Seidenfaden, Erik Nørgaard, Gyldendal, 1998;
- Tøger, Stig Andersen, People's Press, 2011;
- Ameri-Danes and Pro-American Anti-Americans, by Nils Arne Søorensen and Klaus Petersen, in The Americanization of Europe, edited by Alexander Stephan, Berghahn Books, 2006;
