= Tøger Seidenfaden =

Danish journalist and newspaper editor

- Born: 28 April 1957
- Died: 27 January 2011 (aged 53)
- Occupations: Journalist, political scientist

Tøger Seidenfaden (28 April 1957 – 27 January 2011) was a Danish journalist and political scientist, and, from 1993 until his death, editor-in-chief of the broadsheet newspaper Politiken. His father, Erik Seidenfaden, was also a journalist and was editor-in-chief of the newspaper Dagbladet Information.

He was editor-in-chief of Weekendavisen between 1987 and 1992 and managing director of TV 2 from 1992 to 1993. He was a long-time Bilderberg-attendee, and member of the Trilateral Commission's Executive Committee.

== Death ==
Seidenfaden died on 27 January 2011 after a long battle with skin cancer.
