= Gunnar Seidenfaden =

Danish diplomat and botanist

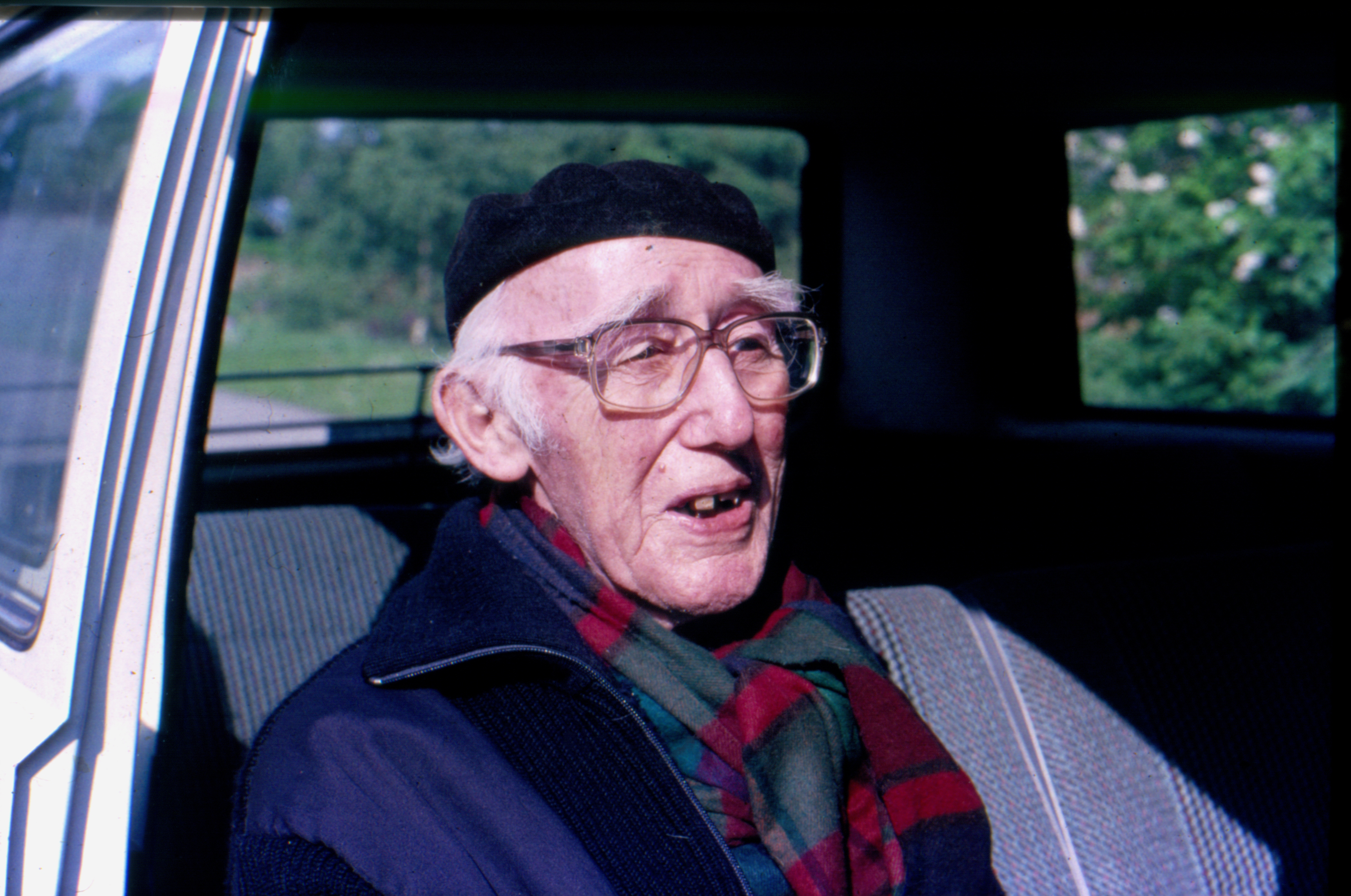
- In front of Hans Christiansen's Orchid Garden
- Born: 1908; Denmark
- Died: 9 February 2001 (aged 92–93)
- Education: University of Copenhagen
- Scientific career
- Fields: Botany
- Author abbrev. (botany): Seidenf.

Gunnar Seidenfaden (1908 – 9 February 2001) was a Danish diplomat and botanist. He was Danish ambassador in Thailand 1955–1959, and in the U.S.S.R. 1959–1961. He was an expert on Southeast Asia Orchidaceae. He published several multi-volume works on orchids, e.g. The Orchids of Thailand – A Preliminary List (with T. Smitinand) and Orchid Genera in Thailand vol. I- XIV. These works are strictly taxonomic and floristic, but decorated with Seidenfaden's own drawings of flower parts as seen under the dissection microscope. His collection of more than 10,000 specimens was donated to the University of Copenhagen, together with original drawings by Katja Anker and others.

In June 2016, it was decided that the collection of orchid samples, which was held in the Danish capital botanical garden Botanisk Have, part of the natural history museum Statens Naturhistoriske Museum, would be returned to Thailand. The reason given was that many of the specimens have become quite rare and the aim is to multiply as many species as possible in sufficient scale so that young plants can be returned to their country of origin. To begin with, a first shipment of cultures of seven rare species to Queen Sirikit Botanic Garden in Chiang Mai was initiated.

== Biography ==
Gunnar Seidenfaden studied botany in the faculty of biological sciences at the University of Copenhagen 1926–1934. He was soon involved in botanical investigations in Greenland. From 1928, he spend six summers in Greenland, partly as a manager of Lauge Koch’s Three-year Expedition to East Greenland. In A Geological Expedition to East Greenland 1931-1932, which was to involve four summers and three winters there, Curt Teichert, writes that Seidenfaden, though officially "in charge of equipment" was in fact, unofficial second-in-command and it was he who took charge of everybody and everything necessary for the running of the expedition. The first trip of the Three-year Expedition sailed with the Royal Greenland Trading Department vessels Gustav Holm, named after the homonymous officer and explorer, and the Godthaab, a 287 tons displacement ship, built after a plan designed by Fridtjof Nansen, and including seaplanes borrowed from the Danish Navy. During the expedition, Eigil Nielsen, a vertebrate palaeontologist, studying the Upper Permian beds of Cape Stosch, in the fjord of Godthab Gulf in King Christian X Land, stumbled upon the first fossils of specimens of the taxon Fadenia, which he named after Seidenfaden. In 1938, Seidenfaden also joined an expedition to Spitsbergen. Unfortunately, he failed his master exam (magisterkonferens) in botany and turned to studies of economy and political science; graduating as Cand.polit. in 1940. He then joined the Danish Ministry of Foreign Affairs.

During WW2, Gunnar Seidenfaden became a helpful source of information to the Danish resistance organisations and in particular its illegal news sheet Information. This because, first as a staff member of the Foreign ministry, and then from Sept. 1944 when he took charge of its press bureau’s newsletter (Udenrigsministeriets Pressebureaus Situationsmelding) - which gathered most of the news which were censured by German officials and was never printed in any of the national or even provincial press – he was able to almost “institutionalize” the co-operation between the ministry and Information. Some 184 issues of the newsletter were produced in all until the end of the war, and one copy made its way to Stockholm every day on the daily German courier plane from Copenhagen, picked by insiders at Stockholm's Bromma airport and delivered to Dansk Presse Tjeneste, the illegal news bureau in which Gunnar's brother Erik Seidenfaden worked. In this way, censored domestic news from Denmark was brought on air by the BBC and broadcast back to Denmark.

After the war, he was dispatched as economic attaché at the Danish embassy in Washington, D.C. until 1950. After returning to Copenhagen for five years, he was stationed in Bangkok, Thailand, from where he acted as ambassador to Manila (Philippines) from 1955, Rangoon (Burma) and Phnom Penh (Cambodia) in 1956 as well as to Vientiane (Laos) in 1957. After his ambassador years, he returned to head the juridical office of the ministry until 1967. He continued to take assignments as Danish envoy at international conferences on environmental matters, e.g. CITES (1973), Helsinki Convention (1979), and the Bern Convention (1979).

In 1938, he won a Scandinavian contest for the best popular science book with “Modern Arctic Exploration”. During his time in Thailand, he initiated a long-standing cooperation with the Royal Thai Forest Department, with which he arranged a number of collecting expeditions until the mid-1980s. In 1951 he was awarded the knighthood of the Order of the Dannebrog, and in 1957 he was given the same of the 1st degree. In 1964 he was made Commander of Dannebrog, of the 1st degree in 1974, and also Commander of the Dutch Order of Oranien-Nassau (Huisorde van Oranje).

== Personal life ==
He was the son of district attorney and Copenhagen's chief constable Aage Valdemar Seidenfaden (1877–1966) and Anna Elise Reenberg Teilman Harck (1887–1928). He married Alix Emilie (Lulu) Arnstedt (1914-1993), daughter of ambassador Niels Peder Arnstedt (1882-1954) and Johanne Larsen (1889-1974) and had five children. He was the brother of the journalist and editor Erik Seidenfaden (1910-1990). He was the nephew of Major Erik Seidenfaden (1881–1958), Danish ethnologist and anthropologist who specialized in Thai culture.

He described at least 120 new species. The Orchid genera Seidenfadenia Garay, Seidenfadeniella C.S.Kumar, Seidenfia Szlach., Gunnarella Senghas, Gunnarorchis Brieger have been named to his honour, as was Fadenia, a genus of extinct Permian sharks, including the subtaxa Fadenia crenulata (E. Nielsen, 1932), Fadenia gigas (Eaton 1962) and Fadenia uroclasmata (Mutter and Nueman 2008).

The Royal Danish Navy operates the 1.660 tons environmental vessel A561 Gunnar Seidenfaden, the second of the two such ships, which was named after him as a botanist. Organizationally, Gunnar Seidenfaden belongs to division 17 (2nd environmental division) in the 1st squadron. Built by Ørskov Christensen Stålskibsværft A/S, Frederikshavn, it was launched in 1981, and before 1996 belonged to the Ministry of the Environment. On 1 January 1996, the ship was transferred to the Royal Danish Navy. The vessel, which is painted in orange-red and cream colors to indicate their civilian purpose, has been on many occasions been deployed to fight oil pollution in Danish waters and also abroad, such as in 2002, when it participated in the clean-up after the sinking of the tanker Prestige off the northwest coast of Spain.

== Other sources ==
- K. S. Manilal, C. Sathish Kumar (2004) Orchid Memories A Tribute to Gunnar Seidenfaden (Mentor Books for Indian Association for Angiosperm Taxonomy) ISBN 9788190032469
- Erik Lund (2016) Fire millioner frie ord - Det illegale nyhedsbureau »INFORMATION« august 1943 – maj 1945 (Institut for Presseforskning og Samtidshistorie)
