= Svend Otto Nielsen =

Danish resistance fighter

- Born: 29 August 1908; Herfølge, Denmark
- Died: 26 April 1944 (aged 35); Ryvangen, Copenhagen, Denmark
- Other name: "John"
- Occupation: Teacher
- Known for: Danish resistance fighter and leader of Holger Danske

Svend Otto Nielsen (29 August 1908 – 26 April 1944) was a Danish resistance operative during the Danish resistance movement during the German Occupation of Denmark (1940–1945). With the code name John, Nielsen led other resistance fighters of the Holger Danske against the Nazis. He was captured, tortured, and executed in April 1944.

== Early life and career ==
Nielsen was born on 29 August 1908 in Herfølge, Denmark, the son of Astrid Vilhelmine and Carl Peter Christian Nielsen, a forest warden. He grew up in Jutland. Nielsen married Marie Lønegren, née Larsen, on 5 July 1935. A physiotherapist, she was born on 13 July 1914. The couple had a daughter.

Nielsen considered careers in agriculture and shipping over two and a half years and then studied at Ranum seminar to become a teacher. In 1930, he took an examination to become a teacher. He served in the military from 1931 to 1932. He then taught at a private middle school in Haderslev. Next, Nielsen taught mathematics at a school in Skovshoved (on the Øresund coast north of Copenhagen, Denmark).

== Danish resistance during World War II ==
Nielson knew Jens Lillelund, the sole fighter of the Forum Copenhagen action that remained in Denmark, and the rest fled to Sweden across the Øresund. The two men rebuilt the Holger Danske resistance group, beginning with six men. Lillelund had lost contact with a paratrooper from Special Operations Executive (SOE), but made contact with Ole Geisler, another SOE parachutist. The SOE supported the resistance movement in occupied countries during World War II. They acquired explosives and money though the Danish Freedom Council. The group expanded to about 20 people. Nielsen led the group HD2, also called group 2, the "lieutenants group" of Holger Danske. Bob Ramsing, later of the Danish State Radio, was a member of the group. Another group included medical students and naval cadets.

The organization sabotaged places to gain weapons and supplies, to damage factories, and to disable railway lines and bridges that transported soldiers and equipment. Holger Danske stored supplies and weapons in a book store near the Gestapo headquarters in Dagmarhus. Needing more space, they later moved their base to Kongens Nytorv (a public square in Copenhagen). HD2 was the most successful resistance group in one four-month period. They bombed factories that made products that the Germans used in the war, including uniforms, radio equipment, bombing sights, as well as canned meat and dried milk.

With Citron and Flame, Jørgen Haagen Schmith and Bent Faurschou Hviid Nielsen picked up weapons that were illegal in Denmark that the Royal Air Force sent. The SOE helped coordinate the distribution of weapons in Denmark. He had a fake police badge which helped get him from being arrested. At times resistance fighters fled to Sweden for their safety. Neilsen, though, stayed thinking that there was always someone more who needed saving.

On 23 October 1943, Nielsen began the first actions as a resistance fighter. With polytechnics and medical students, Nielsen sabotaged Dansk Skovindustri's factory in Næstved. They used arms that sea cadets stole from Holmen, Copenhagen. Five days later, they attacked a Copenhagen tool factory. Nielsen became the leader of Holger Danske (HD) group 2, and he trained other Holger Danske groups. An attack on 28 November 1943 of the Danish Rifle Syndicate in Hellerup followed more minor attacks over the previous several weeks. On 4 December 1943, Nielsen led the sabotage of Hartmann's Machine factory.

HD had learned that the Germans had a device that allowed them to operate in the dark. The British intelligence service wanted the device to use in tandem with a radar system for airplane pilots to help them navigate during dangerous night flights over Germany. Nielsen led the operation to obtain the device from the Kastrup Airport (now Copenhagen Airport).

After Holger Danske bombed two factories, the Gestapo learned of HD2 fighters from an informer. They killed one man from HD2, Peer Borup, and four others were arrested, including Flemming Kieler and his brother Jørgen Kieler. Most of the remaining HD2 fighters went to Sweden, except Hviid, which curtailed their sabotage in February 1944, but there was a greater focus on eliminating the informers.

Svend Otto Nielsen told Jens Lillelund his feelings about working underground while at the apartment of Hedvig Delbo, who was later found to be the Gestapo operative who informed on him,

I hope I survive the war. I've been living underground so long that I can't remember what it was like not to be afraid. I'm always afraid. I'm scared every time a car pulls up outside the door or somebody comes up the stairs. I go cold if a man looks a bit too hard at me in a restaurant as I get up to pay my bill. It would be wonderful to walk around without having to be frightened of anything. I'd like to get back to my school and go hunting with my brot'er, the forester. But how big is the chance? Fifty-fifty? I don't know, but I suppose my chance is better than yours because you're so well-known. I don't think you'll get through, but it's just possible I might...

== Capture, retribution, and death ==
Hedvig Delbo, a Norwegian dressmaker, informed the Gestapo about Nielson for 20,000 Danish kroner. She supplied lodging for underground (resistance) fighters. Nielsen and Jens Lillelund (Finsen) arrived at Delbo's apartment on 6 December 1943 for lodging. In the morning, the Gestapo came for Nielsen and Jens Lillelund (Finsen) after they left Delbo's apartment. Nielsen fell but was still able to shoot two men in a Gestapo car. One man was wounded, and another was killed. A third Gestapo man shot Nielsen with a submachine gun. His right thigh was broken, and he had been shot seven or eight times in his abdomen. His head was badly beaten with the butt of a gun, fracturing his skull. Nielsen was removed from the area and was tortured. Lillelund was able to bike down a narrow street that the car driven by the Gestapo could not traverse.

Lillelund, also having the code name Finn, tried to kill Delbo for being an informer. He failed and fled to Sweden. Delbo lived and escaped to Norway but later returned to Copenhagen and operated a dressmaking shop under an assumed name. She was killed in the winter of 1944 by Gunnar Dyrberg.

Neilsen was captured and suffered torture and inhumane treatment to get him to provide information, but he never did. The most notable attacks made by HD were to a steel mill in Jutland and the B&W shipbuilding yard in Copenhagen, which were conducted in retribution for Nielsen's arrest and treatment.

Nielsen met up with Jørgen Kieler in the Copenhagen prison. Nielsen was unable to move out of bed due to his broken leg, and he was in a poor state. He had no means to go to the toilet or wash himself and he had not had medical treatment for three or four months (December 1943 to April 1944). He had to bind his leg with newspapers. On a few occasions, Kieler was allowed to carry him outside and to the toilet.

A German judge court-martialed Nielsen for killing a German policeman and for sabotage and sentenced him to execution. Nielsen was too weak to stand up and was carried to the place of his execution at Ryvangen (an execution and burial site for members of the Danish resistance). He was shot and killed on 26 April 1944. His body is interred at the Ryvangen Memorial Park in Copenhagen.

His obituary stated of his execution, "Probably he couldn't even stand upright by a wall - he was one of them though the most upright people in the fighting Denmark." Memorial plaques were installed at Skovshoved School, Ranum State Seminary, Årestrup Church, and Skovshoved Church.

== Bibliography ==
- Goldberger, Leo (1987). The rescue of the Danish Jews : moral courage under stress. New York : New York University Press. pp. 148–149. ISBN 978-0-8147-3010-2.
- Lampe, David (2011). Hitler's savage canary : a history of the Danish resistance in World War II. Barnsley, S. Yorkshire : Frontline Books; New York : Skyhorse Pub. ISBN 978-1-84832-574-6.
- Thomas, John (1976). The giant-killers : the story of the Danish resistance movement, 1940-1945. New York: Taplinger Publishing Company.
