= Gunnar Dyrberg =

Gunnar Dyberg
- Born: 12 November 1921; Fåborg, Denmark
- Died: 8 January 2012 (aged 90); Hørsholm, Denmark
- Other names: Code names: Herman Olsen, Hermann Olsen
- Occupation(s): Economist, banker, public relations
- Known for: Danish resistance fighter, post-war economic recovery leader, author, and editor

Gunnar Dyrberg (12 November 1921 – 8 January 2012) was a member of the Danish resistance movement during World War II. He was a leader of Holger Danske, a Danish resistance group in the capital Copenhagen, from 1943 to 1945. After the war, Dyrberg became a public administrator, holding several appointed positions in government, and later a public relations executive in banking. For more than 40 years, he also owned and operated a horse farm, breeding and training Icelandic horses in Høsterkøb, North Zealand. From 1994 to 2000, Dyrberg published novels and memoirs based on his experiences in the Danish resistance movement.

He was featured in the 2003 Danish documentary film, With a Right to Kill (Med ret til at dræbe), based on the 2001 history by Peter Øvig Knudsen. The book and film were part of some of the first efforts by Danes to seriously study issues raised by the liquidation of 400 persons by the Danish resistance during the war. The film featured news footage, interviews with surviving agents and leaders of the Resistance movement, and reconstruction of known events. Dyrberg's Holger Danske group was also the subject of Flame and Citron (Flammen og Citronen, 2008), a Danish fictionalized dramatic film based on actions of its two most noted members, who were both killed by the Germans before the end of the war.

== Early life ==
Dyrberg was born on 12 November 1921 in Fåborg, Denmark and he grew up in Vesterbro, Copenhagen. In 1940, he studied mathematics at Vester Borgerdyd Gymnasium (now Københavns åbne Gymnasium, meaning Copenhagen's Open Gymnasium).

== Nazi occupation and resistance ==
After Nazi Germany invaded Denmark (beginning 9 April 1940), Dyrberg was among the many young men who joined the Danish Resistance. He used the code name, "Herman," to disguise his identity during the German occupation.

He rose to lead group 5 of the Holger Danske, a resistance group in Copenhagen from 1943 to 1945. His activities included sabotage, military actions, leadership, and rescue. He was also a member of the illegal press. Dyrberg had a very close working relationship with Bent Faurschou-Hviid ("Flame") and Jørgen Haagen Schmith ("Citron"), two of the most noted members of the group. After the war, Dyrberg admitted that he had directed the killing of several German informants and soldiers, though the number has never been publicly revealed. He killed Hedvig Delbo on 9 March 1944, with Patrick Scultz, and he killed Erik Victor Pedersen.

The Gestapo hunted him, requiring Dyrberg to jump out of a window on three occasions as he was being shot at. He moved 30 times in six months to avoid being captured. By the spring of 1944, there were only three members of Holger Danske that remained out of a group of 25, many killed on the same day. Lillelund, who had fled to Sweden, returned to Copenhagen to lead the group. Knud Larsen and others returned to Holger Danske, affiliating with Frode Jacobsen's organization, Ringen (the Ring), having freed themselves of Dansk Samling (Danish Unity).

In 1945, Dyrberg was appointed head of the Resistance Press Office. For decades after the war, issues related to the choices of Danish targets to be liquidated were not much discussed; politicians wanted to support the resistance in the postwar effort to rebuild their society.

== Post-war years ==
He went to college after the war, studying politics, receiving a degree in 1948 at the University of Copenhagen.

=== World War II economic recovery programs ===
From 1946 to 1947, he was with the Ministry of Foreign Affairs. He worked in Germany temporarily as the head of the British headquarters of the Danish military mission.

He worked for the government on programs to implement the Marshall Plan, serving in the Directorate for Commodity Supply, a trade policy department (1948–52), and in the productivity committee of the Ministry of Commerce, the predecessor of Denmark's Enterprise Fund (1952-1953). He helped improve the efficiency of industry, trade and commerce in Europe. He worked for the productivity centers of Italy and Greek as a consultant.

In 1956 he worked as the head of the consultants and architects of the merchant service for De Samvirkende Købmandsforeninger He developed cost standard figures for merchants 1956, 1957 and 1958. In 1959, he accepted a position at The Trades Council, a position he held until 1965. He was a member of trade ministerial committees and was secretary of Handværkets Oplysningsforbund.

He continued to represent businesses, for instance the Federation of Merchant Associations. He re-entered government when appointed as Secretary of Craft, and worked in several trade ministry areas.

=== Communications and literature ===
He served as editor for several journals: one related to the Resistance, as well as professional magazines. This work included being editor of Holger Danske's Home Guard Association's magazine, 1946–48; the weekly magazine Building Trades, 1958–65; Danish Crafts 1960–62; Advice: The Danish Bank Staff Bulletin, 1966–85; Quarterly, Farmers' Bank's financial magazine, 1967–71; and Pondus Item, 1967–82; and the member magazine of the Danish Invest, 1987–1992.

Dyrberg began writing fiction and memoirs to explore and share his experiences during the war. Beginning in 1994, he published several books: both novels and memoirs about his time in the Danish resistance movement.

=== Banking and horsebreeding ===
Beginning in 1966, Dyrberg worked at the Farmers' Bank (The Danish Bank beginning 1976). He was appointed the first head of public relations and information. Dyrberg retired as deputy director in 1987. From 1987 to 1992, ehwas the editor of the Danske Invest magazine.

From 1971 until 2012, Dyrberg also owned and operated the Lille Søgård (Small Sogard), a farm for breeding and training Icelandic horses. It was located in Høsterkøb, North Zealand.

== Personal life ==
In 1946, Dyrberg married Lulla and they had two sons together. Lulla died in 1998. Gunnar Dyrberg died at his home in Hørsholm following a long illness on 8 January 2012, at the age of 90.

== Popular culture ==
Dyrberg was featured in the 2003 documentary film, With a Right to Kill (Med ret til at dræbe), about the Holger Danske group. The 2008 Danish dramatic film, Flame and Citron (Flammen og Citronen), featured two of his most prominent agents as the central characters, and portrayed the complex, morally ambiguous relations within the Resistance.

== Books ==
- 1994, Explosion in May
- 1994, The Tomato Is Rotten
- 1995, Shot in the Avenue
- 1997, Debit Left - Credit to the Right
- 2000, When the Villagers Get Peasants

== Bibliography ==
- Thomas, John (1976). The giant-killers : the story of the Danish resistance movement, 1940-1945. New York: Taplinger Publishing Company.
