= Hedvig Delbo =

Norwegian Gestapo agent (1908–1944)

- Born: 13 September 1908; Norway
- Died: 13 March 1944 (aged 35); Vesterbro, Copenhagen, German-occupied Denmark
- Cause of death: Assassination by gunshot
- Other name: Mrs. Dam
- Occupation: Dressmaker
- Known for: Informing on Danish resistance fighters to the Nazi Gestapo during World War II

Hedvig Delbo (13 September 1908 – 9 March 1944) was a Norwegian agent for the Gestapo during World War II.

== Personal life ==
Hedvig Delbo was a Norwegian dressmaker. Her fiancé, Max Pelving was also a Gestapo agent.

== Gestapo agent ==
Delbo supplied lodging for underground (resistance) fighters in 1943 after she got them to trust her. She then informed on them and they were arrested by the Gestapo. For instance, she informed on Svend Otto Nielsen (codename John) and Jens Lillelund (Finsen) of the Holger Danske resistance group for which she received 20,000 Danish kroner. The Gestapo came for Nielsen after he left Delbo's apartment. Nielsen was wounded, arrested, and tortured. Jens Lillelund, code name of Finn, tried to kill her for being an informer. He failed and fled to Sweden. Delbo escaped to Norway, but later returned to Copenhagen and operated a dressmaking shop under an assumed name, Mrs. Dam.

Ella von Cappeln, a former nun who worked for the resistance movement, had won Delbo's trust and gained access to her apartment, and then helped two comrades gain entry.

In March 1944, it was reported in the Dagens Nyheter, that Delbo and Pelving had been arrested and wounded. Delbo was then shot dead, also in the month of March 1944, in her apartment on Sankelmarksgade at Vesterbro, Copenhagen by two men. They were resistance fighters from the Holger Danske resistance group.

Delbo also owned an apartment on Saxogade. Max was arrested in May 1945 for his work for the Gestapo.

== Bibliography ==
- Goldberger, Leo (1987). The rescue of the Danish Jews : moral courage under stress. New York : New York University Press. pp. 148–149. ISBN 978-0-8147-3010-2.
- Lampe, David (2011). Hitler's savage canary : a history of the Danish resistance in World War II. Barnsley, S. Yorkshire : Frontline Books; New York : Skyhorse Pub. ISBN 978-1-84832-574-6.
- Thomas, John (1976). The giant-killers : the story of the Danish resistance movement, 1940-1945. New York: Taplinger Publishing Company.
