= Jørgen Haagen Schmith =

Danish resistance member (1910–1944)

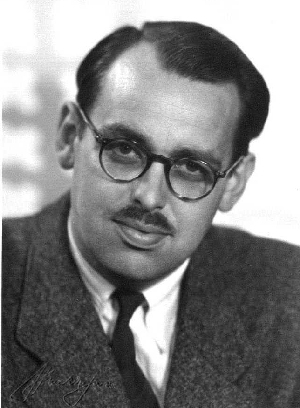
- Jørgen Haagen Schmith
- Born: 18 December 1910; Grew up in Gentofte, Denmark
- Died: 15 October 1944 (aged 33); Gentofte, Denmark
- Other names: Cover names Citronen, Citroën Schmidt, Citron-Smith
- Occupations: Entertainment worker and director, Citroën worker and director
- Known for: Danish resistance fighter, partner of Bent Faurschou Hviid (Flame), saboteur, and killer of Nazis and informers for Holger Danske

Jørgen Haagen Schmith, also spelled Jørgen Haagen Schmidt (18 December 1910 – 15 October 1944), known by the codename Citronen (Danish for 'the Lemon'), was a renowned fighter in the Danish resistance movement during the German Occupation of Denmark (1940–1945). He was a saboteur, including his involvement in the bombing of the Forum Copenhagen. He was also a rescuer and liquidator. He died after a multi-hour firefight with German soldiers on 15 October 1944.

In 1951, he and his partner Bent Faurschou Hviid were posthumously awarded the United States Medal of Freedom by President Harry S. Truman. The film Flame & Citron (2008) portrays the renowned partners and the Holger Danske group.

== Life ==
Jørgen Haagen Schmith was born on 18 December 1910 and grew up in Gentofte, Denmark. His father worked for a coal company until he died during the Spanish flu epidemic (1918–1920). At age 10, Schmith became the father figure for his two brothers.

Schmith tried several vocations before he turned 26, including working on a coal boat, training in a hardware store, and farming. He then worked at the Zigeunerhallen, an entertainment venue, as a porter and then a director.

Schmith lived in Charlottenlund, a suburb of Copenhagen. He worked at Citroën in Copenhagen before the war as an assembler, worker, and director. His father-in-law was a foreman there. Schmith sabotaged the cars brought in for servicing by pouring sand powder in the carriage bearing and sugar into the fuel.

== World War II ==
Following the German invasion, Schmith was a Danish resistance fighter, joining the Holger Danske group in the spring of 1943. He was involved in sabotage, rescuing Danish refugees, and liquidating (of informers or otherwise risky people) in Copenhagen. He was also associated with De frie Danske (The Free Danes) and Speditøren organizations.

Schmith was one of the participants of the attack on the Forum Copenhagen on 24 August 1943. He escaped to Sweden for a time and then began aiding in transporting Danish Jews and refugees from Denmark to Sweden. He bombed a Citroën factory. Schmith worked with Bent Faurschou Hviid, a fellow resistance operative who was given the code name Flame for his red hair. In 1944, they assassinated Schalburg Corps (Nazi Danes) and Nazi Germans. The Germans were particularly anxious to kill Schmith in 1944. His pregnant wife went to live in Sweden, and his children went to live with his wife's parents.

Gunnar Dyrberg described meeting Schmith in the summer of 1944,

I saw before me a dark-haired, well-built man of middle height. As he held out his hand and introduced himself, I looked at him curiously. He had a pleasant face, with kind brown eyes, and his smile was warm and friendly. He didn't look at all as I had expected. Citronen (The Lemon) was said to be fantastically daring, extremely fast in his reactions, and completely merciless when it was a matter of carrying out a dangerous mission. I shouldn't have dreamed that this man possessed such qualities. He looked like any ordinary family man of thirty-four, with no thoughts on his mind but keeping his job and looking after the wife and kids. I should have passed him in the street without a second glance. No one could have believed that he was one of the two most wanted men on the Gestapo's black-list. The other was his friend, Flammen.’

Schmith was picked up at a roadblock in Copenhagen by a member of the Danish Nazi group Schalburg Corps on 19 September 1944. He dressed like a Danish policeman the same day the Germans intended to collect Danish lawmen and send them to Nazi concentration camps. Schmith was shot while trying to escape and was put into an ambulance. In the vehicle were a Schalburg soldier and an ambulance driver, a member of the Holger Danske resistance group. Schmith distracted the soldier and shot and killed him with a small gun tucked away in his boot. The soldier was delivered to a German field hospital. Schmith went to a hospital and found out that his left lung was perforated, and he received a blood transfusion. Soon after, to avoid being captured when Nazis searched hospitals, Schmith went to the home of Strøm-Tejsen, a resistance fighter and engineer, where he received care from the nurse Ellen Christensen, a Danish resistance fighter in her own right.

Unaware that Schmith was in the house, the Gestapo came to arrest Strøm-Tejsen on the night and early morning of 14 and 15 October. At about midnight, two men entered the house, and a German man pointed a machine gun at Christensen's chest. Schmith opened fire, injuring a German soldier. Schmith threw a hand grenade, armed himself with machine guns and grenades (coincidentally left under his hospital bed), and began fighting. He fought against 200 German soldiers for four hours, injuring 20 soldiers and killing six more. The house was set on fire by the Germans, and Schmith was killed by several German bullets (Note: Or eight soldiers were killed and four were injured.) on 15 October 1944. During that time, Christensen was guarded by Nazi soldiers outside the house. As time went on, she found hiding places until the Germans were distracted long enough for her to escape. She went in search of someone who would hide her. After six tries, she found someone who would take her in. She made it out safely, but her cover was blown when the soldiers later found fake identification information in her purse that had been left in Strøm-Tejsen's house.

Schmith was buried at Ryvangen Memorial Park, where his memorial stone is engraved, "For alle gode tanker / De kan slet ikke dø / Før endnu bedre tanker / Er spired af deres frø" ("For all good thoughts / They cannot die at all / Before even better thoughts / Are germinated from their seeds.")

In 1951, Schmith and Bent Faurschou Hviid (Flame) were posthumously awarded the United States Medal of Freedom by President Harry Truman.

== Popular culture ==
- After decades of official silence about the Resistance movement, Peter Øvig Knudsen published a novel about the Resistance, With the Right to Kill, and its execution of an estimated 400 persons.
- In 2003, this was adapted as the documentary film With the Right to Kill, exploring the actions of the Danish Resistance, including the Holger Danske group. Directed and co-written by Morten Henriksen, it used historical footage, interviews, and reconstructions of events.
- In 2008, Danish producer Lars Bredo Rahbek released a drama/action film about Schmith and Faurschou Hviid, entitled Flame & Citron (Flammen og Citronen). It was directed by Ole Madsen, with Mads Mikkelsen playing the role of Citron and Thure Lindhardt as Flame.
