= Cheminova =

Danish producer of agrochemicals

Coordinates: 56°39′29.52″N 8°12′13.54″E

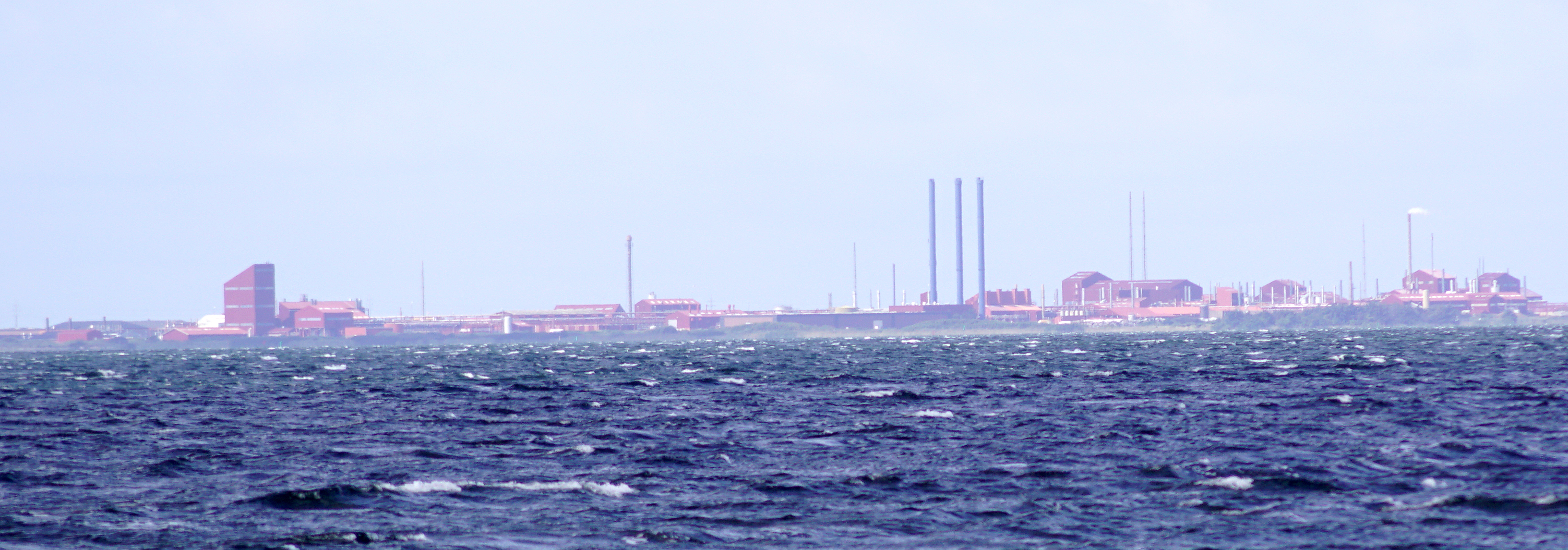
- Cheminova seen from Gjeller Odde
- Company type: A/S
- Industry: Chemicals
- Founded: 1938
- Founder: Gunnar Andreasen
- Fate: Purchased by FMC Corporation
- Headquarters: Lemvig, Denmark
- Products: Agrochemicals
- Revenue: DKK 5 billion
- Owner: FMC Corporation
- Number of employees: 2,000+
- Website: fmcagro.dk

Cheminova's location in Denmark

Cheminova is a Danish global company that primarily produces agrochemicals. Its main activities are the identification, development, production, registration and marketing of pesticides for the management of weeds, insects and fungal diseases in crops.

The company was floated in 1986 and is today owned by the American FMC Corporation, which purchased Cheminova for approximately DKK 8.5 billion in 2014. Prior to this, it was owned by Auriga Industries A/S, which was listed on the stock exchange NASDAQ OMX, Copenhagen (Københavns Fondsbørs) and wholly owned by Aarhus Universitets Forskningsfond (English: Aarhus University Research Fund).

Cheminova has subsidiary distribution companies and local representatives in more than 30 countries. The company has an annual turnover in excess of DKK 5 billion, where exports contribute 99%. It has approximately 850 employees in Denmark and over 1,200 overseas.

== History ==
Cheminova was founded in Copenhagen in 1938 by the civil engineer Gunnar Andreasen. At first, it produced anti-rust treatments at a factory located north of Copenhagen at Sydmarken 10–12, Mørkhøj. Production of the treatments was halted during the German occupation of Denmark under the Second World War because the required raw materials were unavailable. Instead, the company began to produce alternatives for various goods that were difficult to obtain in Denmark as a result of the war. These included replacements for raw rubber and sugar, as well as thinners for paints and varnishes. The factory was twice sabotaged by Danish resistance groups: by Holger Danske on 2 January 1945, and by BOPA on 14 February 1945.

From 1944–46 a new factory, again close to Copenhagen, was built at Måløv Byvej 229–233, Måløv. Production there was concentrated on insecticides, since the Allied victory had led to the release of several German patents for these chemicals. However, the factory had ongoing disputes with residents and the local authority regarding the effect of waste water from the plant on aquatic environments. Partly as a result of this, in 1953 the company moved its operations to Harboøre Tange (a large sand spit) and Rønland (a peninsula), near Lemvig in West Jutland, where its main operation remains today.

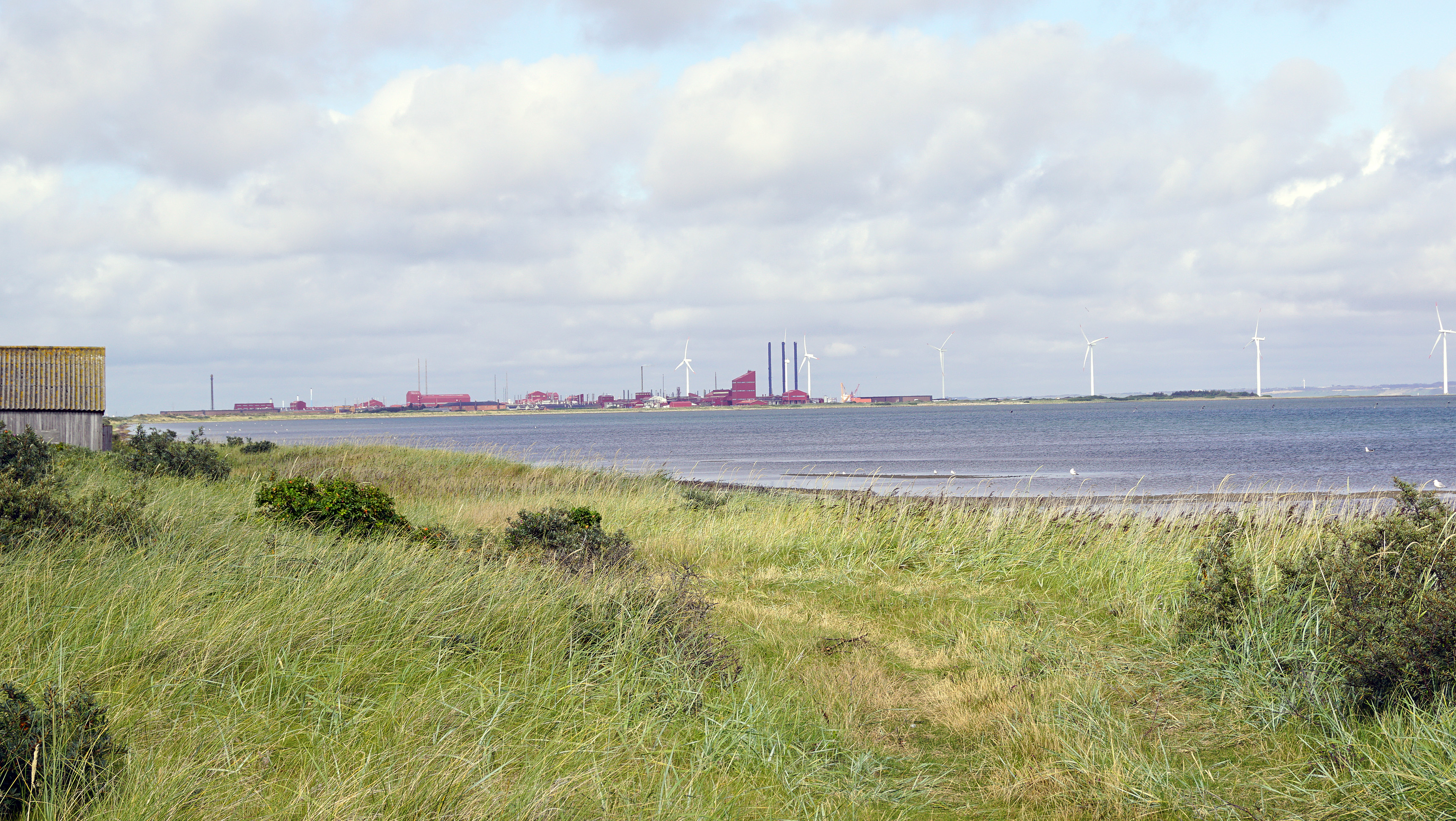
Cheminova with Limfjorden in the foreground

A further reason for the relocation was the presence of a large salt dome under Rønland: chlorine was an important constituent of the company's products, and it was thought that the new plant could extract this from the local salt, with any excess sold on for profit. One of the company's first purchases after the relocation was a salt extraction plant, which was quickly decommissioned after the local authority's decision to refuse permission for the sale of the excess salt made it unprofitable.

In 1943, Gunnar Andreasen transferred all Cheminova shares to Aarhus Universitets Forskningsfond (Aarhus University Research Fund).

== Pollution ==
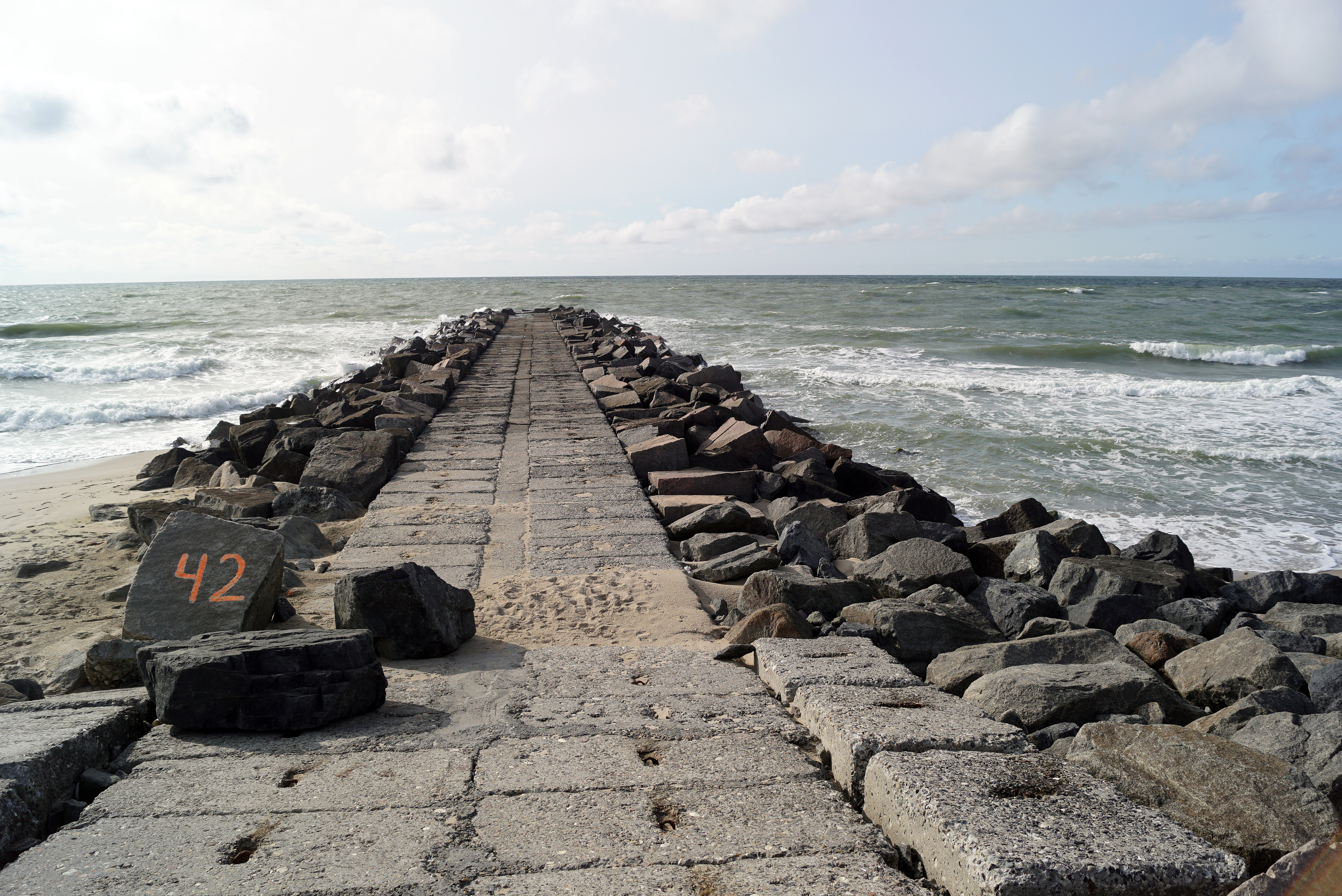
Høfde 42 at Harboøre Tange

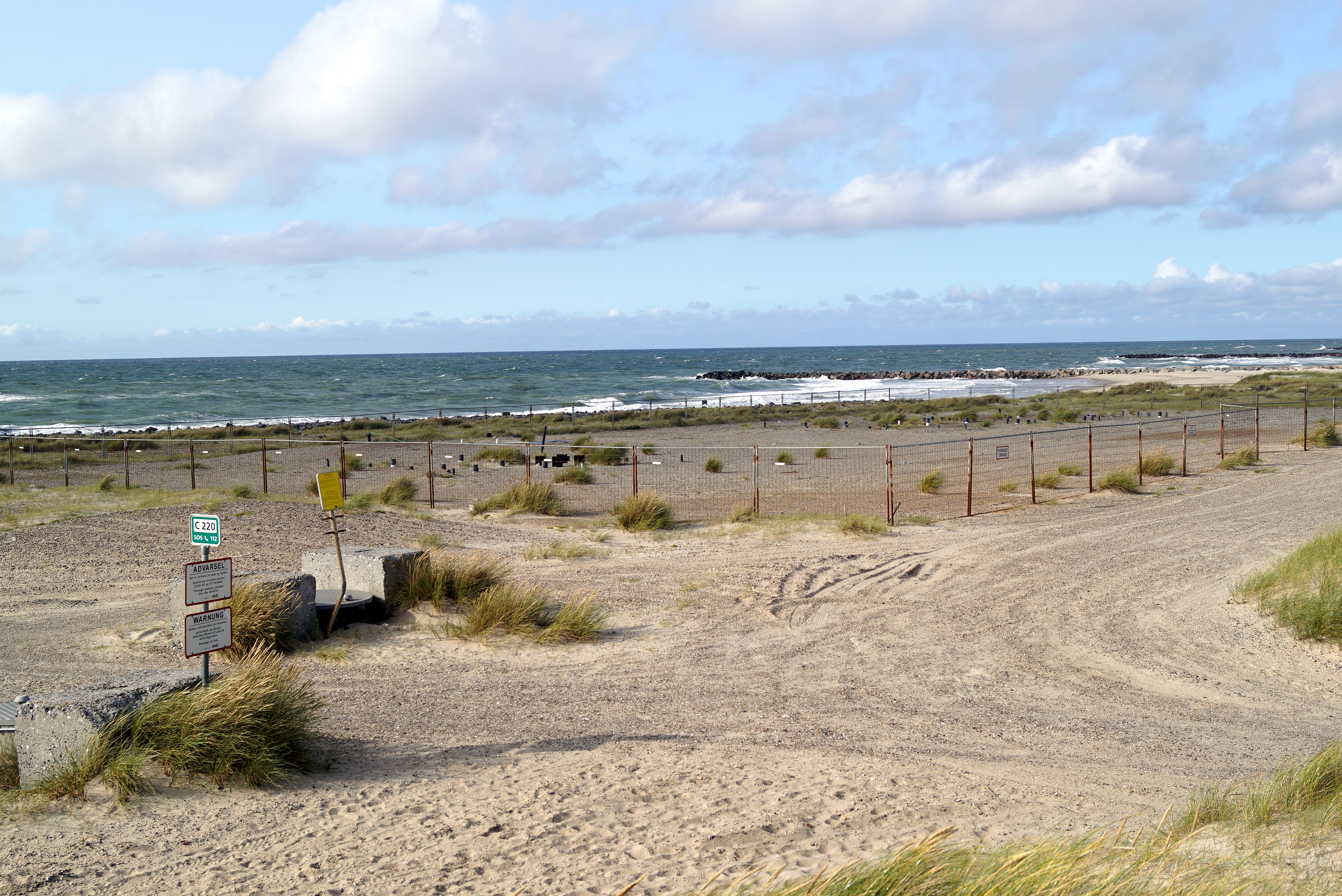
Chemical dump at Harboøre Tange

Cheminova's early operations left significant soil contamination at both the Mørkhøj and Måløv sites.

A municipal chemical waste dump at Høfde 42 (English: Groyne 42), Harboøre Tange, was previously heavily used by Cheminova for the disposal of dangerous solid and liquid chemical waste in the late 1950s and early 1960s. In 2014, Region Midtjylland (English: Central Jutland Region, the local authority) estimated the cost of removing the resulting ground contamination at DKK 0.25 billion.

In recent years, controversy has arisen surrounding the environmental practices of Cheminova, a prominent chemical company. It has been alleged that despite regulations set forth by governmental bodies, specifically the Ministry of Environment (Miljøministeriet), Cheminova has continued its polluting activities unabated.

Critics have accused the Ministry of Environment of failing to effectively regulate Cheminova's activities, instead opting to amend regulations in a manner that allows the company to persist in its polluting behavior. Rather than holding Cheminova accountable for its environmental impact, it is claimed that the Ministry has simply shifted regulatory standards, effectively "moving the goalposts" to accommodate Cheminova's operations. https://www.dr.dk/stories/1288510966/explainer-saadan-har-miljoeministeriet-gjort-det-muligt-for-cheminova-at-fortsaette-deres-forurening https://www.dr.dk/nyheder/indland/miljoeministeriet-anklages-magtfordrejning-har-hjulpet-cheminova-med-fortsat-kunne

Of particular concern is the emission of hazardous substances such as arsenic, a well-known carcinogen, into the environment. Despite the known risks associated with arsenic exposure, Cheminova's activities have allegedly continued to contribute to its release into the surrounding ecosystems.

This controversy highlights the delicate balance between industrial development and environmental protection. It raises questions about the efficacy of regulatory bodies in ensuring that companies prioritize environmental stewardship alongside their economic interests.

== Products ==
Cheminova's current products include insecticides, weedkillers and fungicides, as well as some fertilisers. These agrochemicals are mostly sold as ready-to-use mixes under own-brand labels and registrations. In addition, a number of non-agricultural chemicals are sold, including froth flotation aids for the mining industry and preservatives for the food industry.

For a number of years, organophosphate pesticides (such as Parathion) were Cheminova's main product. This later diversified significantly into the wider portfolio mentioned above, partly through internal development, but also through purchasing from competing companies.

This development has focused on improving the chemical processes used for production, and also on reducing the environmental impact of the products. Alongside this, a number of very toxic pesticides (so-called WHO class products) have been phased out.
