= Flame & Citron =

- Theatrical release poster
- Danish: Flammen & Citronen
- Directed by: Ole Christian Madsen
- Written by: Ole Christian Madsen; Lars K. Andersen
- Produced by: Lars Bredo Rahbek; Morten Kaufmann; Stefan Schubert; Ralph Schwingel
- Starring: Thure Lindhardt; Mads Mikkelsen; Stine Stengade
- Cinematography: Jørgen Johansson
- Production companies: Nimbus Film; Wüste Film; Babelsberg Studio
- Distributed by: Sandrew Metronome
- Release dates: 28 March 2008 (Denmark); 28 August 2008 (Germany)
- Running time: 130 minutes
- Countries: Denmark; Germany
- Languages: Danish; German
- Budget: $8.6 million
- Box office: $10 million

Flame & Citron (Danish: Flammen & Citronen) is a 2008 historical drama film co-written and directed by the Danish director Ole Christian Madsen. The film, a fictionalized account based on historical events, stars Thure Lindhardt and Mads Mikkelsen as two Danish resistance movement fighters nicknamed Flammen and Citronen, during the Nazi occupation of Denmark in World War II. Attracted by the story of the pair since he was twelve, Madsen spent eight years along with co-writer Lars K. Andersen researching historical archives to produce it.

Madsen's idea was to bring attention to the story of Flammen and Citronen as he felt it had been neglected or misrepresented. The most expensive Danish film produced to that date, it was co-produced by German companies because initially there was no interest in producing the film in Denmark. Portraying the protagonists as morally ambiguous characters, the director tried to depict war as a complicated experience that goes beyond a good versus evil dichotomy. With visual and narrative references borrowed from film noir and the French film Army of Shadows, Flame & Citron also explores themes of love, betrayal, and the emotional aspects of relationships.

The film was released in Denmark on 28 March 2008 to positive reviews. The most-watched film in the country that year, it was praised mostly for the actors' performances, dramatic style, and depiction of war and its moral dilemmas. Considered an art film by some critics, the film was compared, both favorably and negatively, to Army of Shadows and other war films; it also sparked a debate over its historical accuracy. Additionally, it was nominated for both domestic and international film awards, including the Robert Awards, the Bodil Awards, and the European Film Awards.

== Plot ==
Set after the Nazi invasion of Denmark, the film focuses on the Holger Danske resistance group's Bent Faurschou Hviid (known as Flammen) and Jørgen Haagen Schmith (known as Citronen). In a bar, Bent flirts with a woman, who identifies herself as Ketty Selmer and disturbs him by saying his real name. Bent follows and confronts her, whereupon she says she is a courier running messages between Stockholm and Copenhagen.

Aksel Winther, Bent and Jørgen's handler, asks them to kill Elisabeth Lorentzen, Horst Gilbert, and Hermann Seibold–members of the Abwehr, German military intelligence. Bent and Jørgen argue over it as they kill only Danes, to reduce the chance of Nazi retaliation. Winther claims to be acting on orders from the government in exile. Bent kills Lorentzen but fails to kill Gilbert and Seibold. Jørgen, his wife, Bodil and their daughter, Ann, celebrate Ann's birthday in their car as they lack money, and Bodil laments over their relationship. Later, Bent, Jørgen and Winther meet Spex from the Danish Army Intelligence. He says there will be no more attacks, as they need peace for a big attack. They agree not to follow Spex's order and Jørgen kills Gilbert. That night, Jørgen robs a grocery store and takes the products to his family; however, Bodil announces she is seeing another man.

After several members of the resistance are killed by the Gestapo, Winther suspects they have an informant. Later, Bent visits Ketty's hotel and they have sex. Jørgen visits his wife and advises her boyfriend to treat her properly or he will return. In a meeting, Winther says the informer is Ketty and orders her death. Bent meets Ketty; she tells him she works for Winther and for army intelligence and that Winther does not work for the British. Winther, involved with Gilbert and Seibold, had ordered their death not to be seen as a traitor. Bent and Jørgen search for Winther in a bar and discover that he has escaped to Stockholm. They realize it is a trap, and escape from the Gestapo. They decide to kill Karl Heinz Hoffmann, the Gestapo leader and then take over the Gestapo's favorite restaurant. Bent abandons his plan when he sees approaching police. That night, Ketty says to Bent that he and Jørgen should go to Stockholm. In the meeting, they are offered positions in the Danish Army but refuse. A man called Ravnen gives them the name of the real informer and Jørgen kills him.

Bent visits his father, a hotel owner, who says Hoffmann, his family and his mistresses visit there on occasion. Bent sees Ketty arrive at the hotel with Hoffman in what appears to be a tryst. Later, Bent confronts Ketty and she says army intelligence requested her to stay close to Hoffmann. Bent asks what car Hoffman uses and what his route is. Later, on the road, Bent, Jørgen and others open fire on two cars with Nazi flags but are dismayed to discover they have killed a father and wounded a child. An enraged Bent goes to Ketty's hotel room, only to discover that she has flown to Stockholm, fearing Hoffmann's retaliation. Bent and Jørgen again plan to kill Hoffmann and disguise themselves as policemen. They are arrested in a general round-up of and execution of the German-allied Danish police. Jørgen leaps a fence and is shot, allowing Bent to escape. Jørgen flees to a safe house but, when a German squad arrives, he kills some with a sub-machine gun and grenades but is killed. Bent, in his home, commits suicide with a cyanide pill when the Gestapo arrives. Later, Hoffmann gives Ketty the reward for helping apprehend Bent and a letter from him found in his room, in which he expresses his feelings and his doubt of her betrayal. The film ends with notes about Bent and Jørgen's legacy.

== Cast ==
- Thure Lindhardt as Bent Faurschou Hviid / Flammen
- Mads Mikkelsen as Jørgen Haagen Schmith / Citronen
- Stine Stengade as Ketty Selmer
- Peter Mygind as Aksel Winther
- Mille Lehfeldt as Bodil
- Christian Berkel as Karl Heinz Hoffmann
- Hanns Zischler as Horst Gilbert
- Flemming Enevold as Spex
- Lars Mikkelsen as Frode Jacobsen / Ravnen
- Jesper Christensen as Flammen's father

== Production ==
=== Development ===
Director Ole Christian Madsen had read the book They Saw It Happen about the anti-Nazi Resistance when he was 12. He was especially attracted by the story of the pair because of their moral ambiguity. Madsen stated, "They both fascinated and scared me, and I sensed there was something dark and untold in their story." He "wanted to make a film that would revive and reassess their reputation". Years later, he met writer Lars K. Andersen, who had also read the book during his childhood, and this led them to envision a film. The project started in 1999; the idea for the film did not attract sponsors because it was viewed as "past history" or because it portrayed the resistance "outrageously". This was precisely one of Madsen's objectives: to talk about their story because Danish wartime archives listed many fatalities simply as casualties of war instead of counting them as murders, thus "suppress[ing]" their real story. He wanted to bring attention to a part of Danish history "the nation has since neglected to talk about", resulting in a "collective misrepresentation". By discussing it, Madsen hoped not to talk about only past but the present since he thinks that "to understand what happens in the world's focal points today goes through history" and that "The story of two illegal rebels is an eternally useful story even if it is played out in 1944".

Even in the wake of major companies' refusal to support the project, Madsen and Andersen continued to research archives in England, Germany and Sweden. In 2005, however, German films about World War II started to become popular, and several German companies became interested in the idea for the film. It became a co-production between Denmark and Germany, with three companies—Nimbus Film, Wüste Film and Babelsberg Studio—producing it. By October 2006, it had already got 75% of its then 45 million Danish kroner (or $7.6 million) budget from the Danish Film Institute, Danish TV 2, and other financiers in Norway, Sweden and Germany. Filming started March 2007 and lasted until May 2007; large parts of the film were shot at locations in Copenhagen, Denmark, and Prague, Czech Republic, and it also took place at the Babelsberg locations in Potsdam-Babelsberg, Germany. It received a €342,000 ($460,000) grant from the German Film Fund for its total budget of $8.6 million (6.3 million), making it the most expensive Danish film produced to that date.

Originally, Madsen planned to create a docudrama-style film but when he discovered Ketty was a Russian spy and had a love affair with Flammen he changed his mind. This finding "forced me to make the film a much more stylish, more noirish piece of work." "Even so, I tried to keep a soft touch style-wise out of respect for the film's subject," said Madsen. He tried to make it feel real by "eliminating the distance to 1944" and directing the film as if it were set in the present.

=== Casting ===
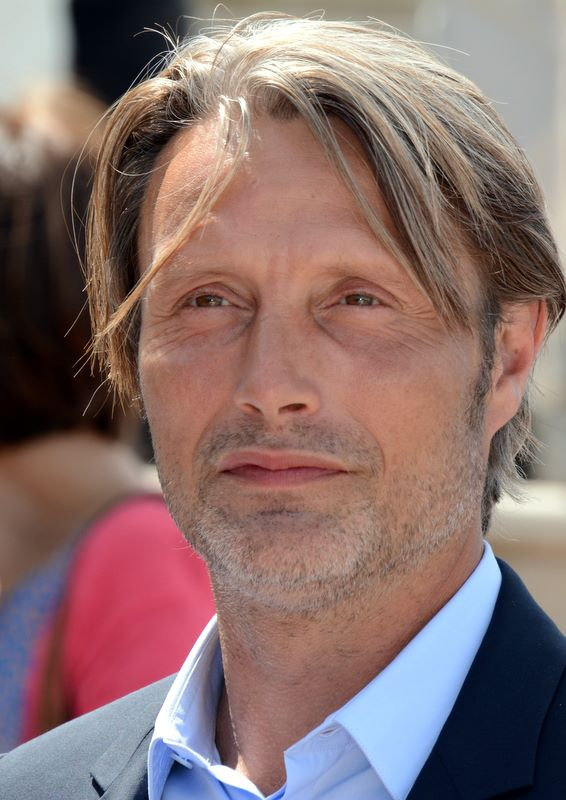
Mads Mikkelsen (pictured) was chosen by director Madsen because of his masculinity and his animal-like attitude.

Thure Lindhardt, a frequent collaborator in Madsen's films with an ability to "slip himself into any part", according to the director, was cast as Flammen. Mads Mikkelsen was chosen to play Citronen by the director before his international career was launched because, as Madsen said, "he has this grand masculinity, and he approaches his roles like an animal". Both Lindhardt and Mikkelsen were cast early in the project, in about 2005, and Stine Stengade was cast as Ketty even earlier—in 2001. The casting process "wasn't really difficult, because I didn't feel that so many people could play these parts", Madsen stated.

=== Visual style ===
The visual style was described by the director as a mix of his own former films which varied from "film-noir in its essence, very dark and very eclectic" to "hand-held", "more visually relaxing". Guy Lodge of Incontention described it as "owing much to film noir in the intricacy of its narrative and the lush, shadow-drenched stylization of its visuals". Wally Hammond, for Time Out London, said its cinematography varies "between atmospheric, noir-esque period evocation and modern widescreen stylings, with excellent use of low-key lighting, silhouettes and location". Mark Jenkins of NPR said it had a "classic look" both in visuals and in storytelling; visually, "with widescreen compositions, overhead shots and dramatic contrasts of light and dark", and in its narrative "[s]ome sequences are quick and messy, but others are grand and theatrical." Joe Morgenstern, critic for The Wall Street Journal, said the "pace is deliberate, [and] the tone is pensive, albeit punctuated by occasional violence."

Madsen was influenced by Jean-Pierre Melville's Army of Shadows (1969), about the French Resistance, especially "the way it told its story through only rituals and dialogue". He watched it about half a year before filming Flame & Citron, and it also inspired "the mythologizing of the characters" in Flame & Citron. Manohla Dargis of The New York Times affirmed, "You can see the Melville touch in the impenetrable shadows that spill across Mr. Madsen's carefully composed mise-en-scène and in the fedoras and trench coats worn by his two heroes." Erica Abeel of The Hollywood Reporter said, "In its tough-mindedness Flame [& Citron] owes much to Jean-Pierre Melville's Army of Shadows."

== Themes ==
A deeply involving look at people living permanently on the knife-edge of danger ... Its biggest accomplishment may be to make these historical conflicts and dilemmas seem surprisingly contemporary. When someone says of the situation, "it's not just or unjust, it's just war," that may be the most modern message of all.

— Kenneth Turan, Los Angeles Times

In the film Madsen tried to challenge the idea of war as "black and white" and the idea that the resistance was "a cohesive whole". He says of war that it "has many more nuances, it is grayer, less defined. When an enemy may stop being one at any time and a friend can become an enemy overnight, things become less clear". Ella Taylor of The Village Voice commented, "Flame & Citron is less about the battle between good and evil than about losing one's way in the fog of war, which makes it hard to tell friend from foe and harder yet to sort through the rules of engagement, and complicates the heroic honor codes of movies about the 'good war.'" Marshall Fine of The Huffington Post asserted that the violence in the film is double-edged: "[it] takes its toll on the perpetrator as well as the victim." Similarly, The Irish Times's Derek Scally stated the film analyses "the dehumanising effect of assassinations on assassin".

Madsen tried to explore this "moral dilemma", "the drama behind the story of the 'illegals'" and human psychology in crisis situations. Madsen ultimately defined his film "as an investigation of what happens psychologically to someone who sacrifices himself in war". Because of this, he portrayed Flammen and Citronen as "modern heroes with cracks in their souls and doubts and insecurities". Citronen even reflected upon killing people but, as Madsen said, "he did it. He sold out his humanity for the highest price." Kenneth Turan of the Los Angeles Times described the story as "a psychologically complex look at what heroism does to heroes. The actions these men take tear at their lives, their families, their very essence." Morgenstern analysed it as "a meditation on the nature of heroism, and the quest for purity of purpose". Turan even said it is "more nihilistic than idealistic", while Tirdad Derakhshani of The Philadelphia Inquirer asserted that it "balances the whizzing bullets and political intrigue with an elegiac tone and an existential edge just this side of nihilism". Its depiction of the resistance in a non-heroic way made it a "one-off film" in Danish cinema, according to film historian Lars-Martin Sørensen.

Another theme the film deals with is the bureaucracy in the resistance, according to Ty Burr of Boston Globe, as the main pair would prefer to work as freelancers. Writing for The Washington Post, Michael O'Sullivan said the film also has "a surprisingly contemporary subtext, as when Hoffmann, in an abortive showdown with Flame, calls his would-be assassin a well-intentioned, but ultimately misguided, terrorist. 'Don't you realize,' Hoffmann asks, 'you're just a tool for someone with less pure motives?'" Burr also commented that "The film repeatedly poses that question ["Who's being set up here?"] and pointedly refuses to answer. By its silence, it suggests that in wartime everyone can be both user and used."

Kenneth Turan affirmed that Flame & Citron has several themes as it "is chock full of plot and incident, action and romance, loyalty and betrayal". Derakhshani stated it "rehearses virtually every element of the classic genre piece: violence, sex and romance, gunplay, spies, betrayals, a femme fatale, and a murderous Gestapo officer". Cynthia Fuchs of PopMatters noted that, though he has to deal mainly with "moral questions, Flame confronts an emotional complication—in the conventional form of a woman". Abeel argued that "For beneath his stony exterior, it's Flame's romantic soul that will prove his worst enemy. This masterful film is at once a portrait of wartime heroism and a poignant journey into a boy's secret heart."

== Release ==
Flame & Citron debuted in Danish theaters on 28 March 2008 and premiered on 28 August 2008 in Germany. The film was seen by over 770,000 people in Europe; it had a public of 668,000 in Denmark, making it the most watched film in the country that year. It grossed $9,210,518 in Denmark for a total of $10,186,084 from screenings in twelve other countries—Argentina, Austria, Colombia, Germany, Greece, New Zealand, Norway, Portugal, Spain, the United Kingdom, and the United States.

Flame & Citron was domestically distributed by Sandrew Metronome in Denmark; it was released on DVD and Blu-ray Disc on 30 September 2008. The film was distributed by Metrodome in the United Kingdom, who released it on DVD on 1 January 2009, theatrically on 6 March 2009, and on Blu-ray on 29 June 2009. In the United States, IFC Films licensed the film, and its North American debut occurred at the Telluride Film Festival on 29 August 2008. IFC released it on demand on 29 July 2009, while its theatrical release was on 31 July 2009, and its home media release was on 23 February 2010.

== Critical reception ==
=== Domestic reviews ===
Critical response to the film was mixed but mostly positive in Denmark, including praise for Madsen's direction, the performances of Lindhardt, Mikkelsen, Stengade and Mygind; opinions were divided about the portrayal of the main characters. The film "has shocked Danish audiences" for its portrayal of the protagonists as non-heroic, and has been criticised by historians. Berlingske's Ebbe Iversen commented that it can be both good and bad to have morally ambiguous characters as it can be seen as "an artistic force" to have "authentic protagonists psychology", but it can also be frustrating to have their motives portrayed as "enigmatic". The critic stated it did not make it a bad film, instead "its subtle, not uncritical portrayal of the resistance seems sober and serious, the style is worked out to the smallest detail, and in its outer form the film is the type of work that you unkindly call conventional and more kindly describe as classic."

Henrik Queitsch of Ekstra Bladet praised the action sequences for its details, even saying it is the best Danish war film ever and said it is also "a booming interesting history and a multifaceted psychological portrait – not only of Flame and Citron, but also of the many people they come across in their path". Kim Skotte of Politiken said it had more gunfire than psychology and that it lacked a more detailed explanation of the characters' backgrounds that would justify their personalities. Writing for Jyllands-Posten, Johs. H. Christensen wrote that there "never occurs any real connection, no excitement, no interaction, no common destiny between Flame and Citron, although they are inextricably linked most of the time".

DR's Per Juul Carlsen declared on Filmland that although the film is visually beautiful, he is not sure it should be this way: "Had it not been better and more correct to tell the story really ugly and blurry in the rain instead of sunshine ... with realism instead of polished exquisiteness[?]". He also criticized it for sharing too much of the American gangster and spy film clichés. The most critical review was done by Georg Metz of Dagbladet Information, who criticized its historicity and thought the characters were psychologically underdeveloped and uninteresting. Metz wrote, "The nicest [thing] one can say about this film, if it is nice, is that it celebrates the naïve view of history" and described it as "[a] neo-nationalistic panopticon of predominantly cardboard figures that will be suitable for evening entertainment for the Danish People's Party and the Liberal Party congresses. Quite apart from that about a third of the dialogue is hard to understand, because the players do not articulate appropriately."

=== International reviews ===
The film was generally well received by Western critics. Based on 70 reviews collected by Rotten Tomatoes, it has an overall approval rating of 86 percent from critics and an average score of 6.8 out of 10. According to the website's consensus, the film, "though lengthy and sprawling, is gripping and competently made". Metacritic, which assigns a normalised rating from 100 top reviews by mainstream critics, calculated a score of 74 based on 20 reviews, indicating "generally favorable reviews".

SFGate's Walter stated, "[t]hough the material might lend itself to heavy-handedness, director Ole Christian Madsen is steady, and he gets fine performances from the two leads and [Stine] Stengade." The actors' performances were also praised by Fine, who said "Lindhardt and Mikkelsen make a fascinating team", while "Stengade is appropriately slippery". Todd McCarthy from Variety asserted that "[p]erformances are low-key but resolute and brimming with nerves and intensity." Marc Savlov of The Austin Chronicle commented that "Mikkelsen and Lindhardt are spectacularly invested in their roles. ... Beyond that is a drop-dead gorgeous period noir, rife with paranoia, femmes fatales, and good men inexorably sinking into the bloody mire and opaque texture of life (and death) during wartime."

Abeel praised how, by "[a]voiding the docu-style string of anecdotes of many fact-based films, it offers the shapeliness and irony of classic drama". Hammond commended Madsen as the film "achieves a sense of psychological complexity – and a pervasive atmosphere of fear and confusion – without sacrificing the rhythm and dramatic tension necessary to a war film". Owen Gleiberman of Entertainment Weekly praised its combination of "sharp scenes of moral inquiry with a few too many functional, oldfangled espionage twists". Fuchs applauded the interpolation of emotional relations as they "help to make Flame & Citron's taut action even more effective. Beautifully choreographed and filmed in deep shadows that cut the violence into shadowy, brutal fragments, Flame and Citron's jobs are at once thrilling and disconcerting". Kate Taylor from The Globe and Mail, however, said the romantic relationship, "predictable in a James Bond kind of way, is the weakest link in the script".

Nick de Semlyen from Empire considered it an average film, saying "It's familiar ground for anyone who's seen Black Book or Sophie Scholl, but director Ole Christian Madsen steers a skilful course, keeping things grim but not to an off-putting extent, bringing a David Lynch-esque vibe to Flame's hotel dalliances with a shady lady and pulling off an incredible death scene for one of the leads." Noel Murray of The A.V. Club criticized it for "hammer[ing] too hard on the shopworn theme of how war sickens souls. Far more interesting is Flame & Citron's other theme: the idea that war turns the notion of 'shades of gray' into a luxury". V. A. Musetto, for the New York Post, commented that, although it "features well-choreographed shootouts and assassinations", its "script is too melodramatic and complicated for its own good". Burr mostly praised it but said that "Madsen eventually loses his way", stating that there was "not enough" information about Citron and that the film "feels packed with events and frustratingly unfocused". Derakhshani argued that it "has some rough, tedious patches – at 130 minutes, it's simply too long. And its reiteration of Hollywood cliches isn't always successful. Regardless, it is, along with Paul Verhoeven's Black Book, one of the most accomplished films to come out of the recent wave of neoclassic and revisionist WW II films".

=== Comparisons to other films ===
Jenkins said the best scenes in Flame and Citron are the ones who share Army of Shadows's "chaos", and he criticised what he described as an aspiration "to be a noble national epic, rather than the rougher, more universal tale of two desperate men fighting for a cause". To Jenkins, Melville's film had a "more cogent outlook" because "[f]ighting the Nazis was just like any other gang war – a mad scramble to survive". On the other hand, Dargis commented that Army of Shadows's "lack of pity" makes it "so unbearably sad, its almost repellent hardness of heart. What Flame & Citron has instead are decent men taking down Nazis... and some appealing actors." Slant Magazine's Tom Stempel affirmed, "I found Army of Shadows both admirable and chilling, and in some ways Flame & Citron is even better."

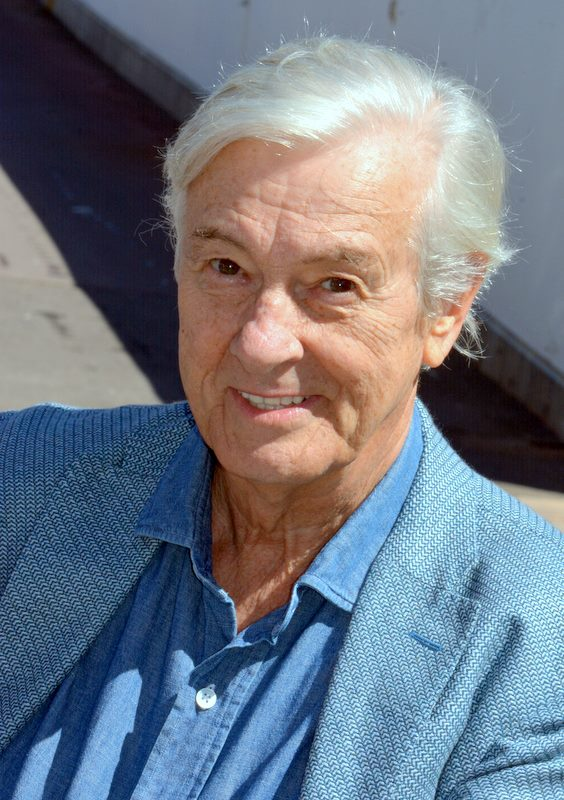
Flame & Citron was compared by several reviewers to Black Book, a 2006 Dutch film by Paul Verhoeven (pictured).

Although he praised the "beautifully choreographed and shot" action sequences, Murray criticized Flame & Citron for "lean[ing] toward the handsome and thoughtful when it could stand to be a lot dirtier and more visceral", citing Black Book as a "superb counter-example". Stempel declared that it "is not as exciting as" Black Book, "but Verhoeven was dealing with people having to make complex moral decisions instantaneously. Flame & Citron takes its time to turn the screws on its characters, and us." Ella Taylor argued in favor of Flame & Citron, saying it "is the film that the horribly overrated Black Book could have been, had Paul Verhoeven not indulged in the puerile reversals of sensitive Nazis and treacherous partisans." Fuchs also compared the moral dilemmas the characters have to deal with to Black Book and Steven Spielberg's Munich but said Flame & Citron does not have "the splendid surrealish excess" and "the weird conflation of maternal bodies and motherlands" of the two films, respectively. Gleiberman could "feel the shadow of Steven Spielberg's Munich hovering over Flame & Citron".

Another film it was compared to was Inglourious Basterds; Brad Auerbach, for Entertainment Today, wrote that "Whereas Inglourious Basterds contains a bevy of cleverly humorous moments as it builds to its climax, Flame & Citron is a calculated and somber treatment of an intriguingly difficult topic." O'Sullivan said that "Inglourious Basterds-style wish fulfillment this isn't," and Burr dubbed it "the anti-Inglourious Basterds". O'Sullivan said that it shared similarities to Butch Cassidy and the Sundance Kid as it is "the story of handsome rogues with guns. It's fast-paced, stylish and thrilling. But it also raises one tough question." Kate Taylor, however, commented that as opposed to Cassidy and Kid, Flammen and Citronen "remain an imperfectly matched duo". St. Louis Post-Dispatch's Joe Williams said that in contrast to "lavish thrillers" Black Book, Inglourious Basterds and Avatar of Hollywood-ish "heroic defiance", Flame and Citron is "lean and psychological, rooted in the either-or of wartime choices".

=== Art-house film status ===
Usually described as a drama or a thriller, Flame & Citron can also be classified as a historical drama, a war film, a war drama (or a war thriller) and a gangster drama. As it has been screened in art-house theaters in the United States and Europe, it has also been described as an art-house film. Lodge stated it has "stately middle-arthouse stylings and thriller overtones". Walter Addiego of SFGate commented that it "has the look, and sometimes the pacing, of a serious Hollywood picture, but it has an art-house mood". Nick Roddick of the London Evening Standard commented that "it could succumb to the Sod's Law of foreign-language cinema: make a arthouse movie too commercial and you risk losing both audiences." Abeel opined, "This icy portrait of two assassins shooting Nazis point-blank offers no Hollywood-style uplift to mollify mainstream viewers. But Flame [& Citron] should pull in a niche group of World War II connoisseurs and will delight art-house and fest audiences with its innovative mix of drama and history filtered through genre."

=== Awards and nominations ===
The film was nominated for fourteen Robert Awards, winning Best Costume Design, Best Make-Up, Best Production Design, Best Sound, and Best Special Effects. Out of three Bodil Awards nominations, Flame & Citron won Best Cinematography. At the Zulu Awards, it won all three awards for which it was nominated. The film was also nominated for the European Film Awards, Marrakech International Film Festival, and Valladolid International Film Festival, but did not win any award.

List of awards and nominations
Year	Award	Category	Recipients (Note: When this space is blank it indicates that the film itself was the recipient.)	Result
2009	Bodil Awards	Best Actor	Thure Lindhardt	Nominated
2009	Bodil Awards	Best Cinematography	Jørgen Johansson	Won
2009	Bodil Awards	Best Danish Film	Ole Christian Madsen	Nominated
2008	European Film Awards	Best Actor	Thure Lindhardt	Nominated
2008	European Film Awards	Best Actor	Mads Mikkelsen	Nominated
2008	Marrakech International Film Festival	Best Film		Nominated
2009	Robert Awards	Best Actor	Thure Lindhardt	Nominated
2009	Robert Awards	Best Cinematography	Jørgen Johansson	Nominated
2009	Robert Awards	Best Costume Design	Manon Rasmussen	Won
2009	Robert Awards	Best Director	Ole Christian Madsen	Nominated
2009	Robert Awards	Best Editor	Søren B. Ebbe	Nominated
2009	Robert Awards	Best Film		Nominated
2009	Robert Awards	Best Make-Up	Jens Bartram and Sabine Schumann	Won
2009	Robert Awards	Best Original Score	Karsten Fundal	Nominated
2009	Robert Awards	Best Production Design	Jette Lehmann	Won
2009	Robert Awards	Best Screenplay	Lars Andersen and Ole Christian Madsen	Nominated
2009	Robert Awards	Best Sound	Hans Møller	Won
2009	Robert Awards	Best Special Effects	Hummer Høimark, Jonas Drehn and Thomas Busk	Won
2009	Robert Awards	Best Supporting Actor	Mads Mikkelsen	Nominated
2009	Robert Awards	Best Supporting Actress	Stine Stengade	Nominated
2008	Valladolid International Film Festival	Best Film		Nominated
2009	Zulu Awards	Best Actor	Thure Lindhardt	Won
2009	Zulu Awards	Best Film		Won
2009	Zulu Awards	Best Supporting Actor	Peter Mygind	Won

== Historical accuracy ==
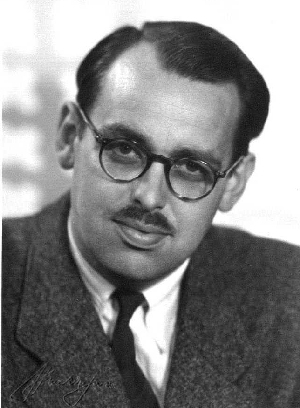
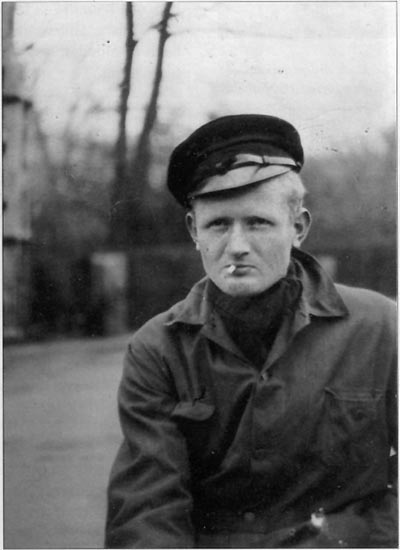
As historical figures of Denmark, the non-heroic portrayal of Citronen (left) and Flammen "shocked Danish audiences", and this and other depictions were source of debate among historians.

The involvement of the Danish people with the Nazis and the assassinations committed by the resistance movement had been a taboo subject since World War II, with scholarly literature on the topic only being produced from the 1980s and 1990s. Contemporary works on Flammen and Citronen have been scarce. Madsen opined, "I think they didn't fit into the official storytelling on how Denmark behaved during the Second World War." Many of the members of the resistance suffered from different traumas, became alcoholics or committed suicide and a very few survived. Because of this, in addition to conducting research for eight years in historical archives, Madsen and his crew interviewed surviving people related to them. Nonetheless, the film has sparked controversy among historians.

The depiction of Flammen's death was challenged by Danish National Archives's Peter Birkelund. In the film Flammen commits suicide in the basement of his house after the Gestapo find him, presumably because of Ketty's betrayal. Birkelund, however, says Flammen was killed on a coastal road while the Gestapo was looking for another resistance member. In contrast, the filming of Citron's death, which would require 250 soldiers, was consciously altered by Madsen for budgetary reasons.

Ketty's depiction as a double agent and Flammen's lover has also been contested by Birkelund. However, Madsen was sure about the affair and found in a Stockholm archive a receipt for 20,000 Danish crowns given to her by the Gestapo two days after Flammen's death. Her involvement with the Gestapo leader Hoffmann, and her refusal to talk about the topic, were the main reasons for Madsen's conclusion.

In the film, Aksel Winther, who is based on Vilhelm Leifer, is the one who gives Flammen and Citronen orders to kill. Birkelund pointed out that he had already moved to Sweden by the time of their assassinations, while Madsen stated he was sure Leifer gave orders before leaving the country. Also, they met Frode Jacobsen in a meeting in Sweden, and he is said to have given orders from there. Birkelund rejected the idea of Jacobsen giving orders, but Madsen said the meetings were created by him to show that the resistance movements of that time had approaches different from those of their present-day counterparts.

Citron's relationship with his wife was debated because historians doubt that she betrayed him, since she gave birth to their child shortly after his death. Madsen was sure the betrayal happened, but he took the liberty of affirming the couple did not get back together. Madsen declared, "I do not think it is morally tarnished to show that people have affairs with people they are not married to. It's a beautiful description of a relationship that falls apart in a time that had great personal cost."

Ole Ewé, a former member of BOPA—another group in the Danish resistance movement—disagreed with the description of the attempt to kill the Gestapo leader Hoffman on the Roskildevej road. In the film, the car had Nazi flags, and a soldier and his son are killed by resistance gunfire. Ewé said that on that day he and other BOPA members were enlisted to kill Arno Oskar Hammeken, a Gestapo informer. Flammen, who also received tips about the informer's whereabouts, appeared there and shot up the car. Ewé said that the man in the car was in civilian clothes and there were no Nazi flags on the car.

I think we're incredibly puritanical about our own history in this country. It bugs me that demands for historical accuracy stand in the way of interpreting the truth in a way that, though it may not correspond absolutely to reality, is somehow more true. We lack an understanding that fiction can play an active role in shaping our identity. It's a shame, because it means we have no real sense of our history.

— Ole Christian Madsen

According to The Irish Times, "Flame & Citron has sparked an emotive public debate in Denmark that has drawn all sorts of pseudo-experts out of the woodwork to debate the portrayal of the period and the two true-life figures". Madsen defended himself saying it was an interpretation that "though it may not correspond absolutely to reality, is somehow more true". Mikkelsen stressed that they were the first "to do the original research, yet we suddenly had a lot of so-called experts telling us how it really was and how we were wrong". The actor affirmed not too much is known about the period and they hope it sparks the debate so "people will research and think some more about it".

In the book Historicizing the Uses of the Past, edited by Helle Bjerg, Claudia Lenz and Erik Thorstensen, the authors compared the criticism Flame & Citron received for its historical representation to that received by Max Manus: Man of War, a Norwegian film about the Norwegian resistance movement. While Madsen's film has been highly criticized by historians, Max Manus gained the status of "real past" and received only a few criticisms that were dismissed by resistance veterans, politicians and even the king Harald V. Bjerg et al. argued that the difference in reception may be attributed to the films' content, saying, "In stark contrast to Flame & Citron, [Max Manus] doesn't challenge the notions of the right and the wrong side and the unambiguous good cause."
