= Lis Mellemgaard =

Danish ophthalmologist and resistance spy (1924–2019)

Lis Mellemgaard (née Wognsen, 20 February 1924 – 5 July 2019) was a Danish ophthalmologist and resistance spy. A member of the Holger Danske Group, she escaped execution by the Nazis as she remained at home with a sore throat. After completing her studies at the University of Copenhagen in 1952, she opened a practice as an eye specialist in Hillerød.

== Biography ==
Born as Liss Wognsen on 20 February 1924 in Copenhagen, she was the only child of a marine engineer and a seamstress. Raised on Amager, she matriculated from Christianshavns Gymnasium in 1943 and went on to study medicine at Copenhagen University.

Her early work in connection with the Dansk Samling party prepared her for involvement in the resistance movement from August 1943 when the Danish government ceased cooperating with the Germans. Initially, she distributed illegal newspapers and books, kept guard at sabotage sites and tracked suspected informers. As time went by, she was trained to shoot and take care of weapons and ammunition.

In February 1945, her colleagues in the Holger Danske group were arrested at a watchmaker's shop where they regularly met. Mellemgaard was not among them as she had stayed at home with laryngitis. They were taken to police headquarters, beaten and imprisoned. Most of them were executed three weeks later.

After the war, she completed her medical studies in 1952 and married a doctor the following year. Together they had three children. She had her own practice as an eye specialist in Hillerød from 1952 to 1970. For many years she did not discuss her involvement in the resistance but in 1998 she wrote an autobiography: Pige i modstandskampen (Girl in the Resistance).

== Awards ==
- 2000: Queen Ingrid Commemorative Medal
- 2010: Gudmund Schacks Mindelegat

== Publications ==
- Mellemgaard, Lis (1998). Pige i modstandskampen: glimt fra min glemmebog. Museum Tusculanum Press. ISBN 978-87-7289-517-8.
