= Atlas A/S =

Machine factory in Copenhagen, Denmark

Atlas A/S was a Danish machine factory and iron foundry headquartered in Copenhagen, Denmark.

== History ==
The company was founded in 1888 and started operations on 1 January 1889. as a continuation of Tuxen & Hammerich. Tuxen & Hammerich specialized in the manufacture of steam engines but had in 1891 started a production of industrial refrigerators.

The company was headquartered at the corner of Nørrebrogade and Baldersgade. The property was acquired from Nørrebro Tramways (Nørrebros Sporveje) and had previously house a remise complex. In 1898, Atlas also acquired a property at the corner of Lyngbygade (now Hillerødgade) and Gasanvej, which was used for the construction of an iron foundry and boiler forge.

Atlas acquired Nielsen & Winther's hydraulics division in 1931. During World War II, a group of employees secretly used the factory for manufacturing weapons for the resistance group Holger Danske.

In 1950, Atlas relocated to Lundtofte. In the 1950s, the number of employees reached around 2,000. Atlas manufactured approximately half of all refrigerators sold to consumers on the Danish market. The refrigerator division was sold to Electrolux in 1968.

The remainder of the company started a collaboration with Thomas Ths. Sabroe & Co.. and changed its name to Sabroe-Atlas A/S after merging with the company in 1974. The company was acquired by employees in 1983 and the name was changed its name first to Atlas-Danmark A/S in 1984 and then in 1986 til to Atlas Industries A/S. In 1987, it was acquired by Norwegian company Stord International AS. It was later sold to Haarslev Industries and closed as an independent subsidiary.

== See also ==
- Titan A/S
