= Jørgen Kieler =

Danish physician and resistance member (1919–2017)

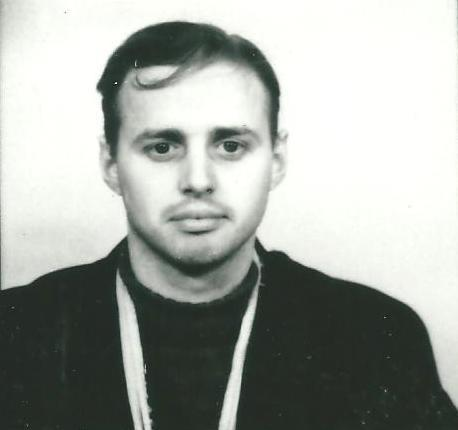
- Jørgen Kieler during the years of occupation
- Born: 23 August 1919; Denmark
- Died: 19 February 2017 (aged 97)
- Occupations: Physician, Director of Danish Cancer Society
- Known for: Danish resistance fighter of Holger Danske

Jørgen Kieler (23 August 1919 – 19 February 2017) was a Danish physician, remembered primarily for his participation in resistance activities under the German occupation of Denmark in the early 1940s. He was captured and was placed in a prison and Nazi concentration camps. Saved by the White Buses of the Bernadotte rescue, Kieler was treated for tuberculosis for two years after his release.

After the war, he wrote a book about his war-time experiences and supported other Danish concentration camp survivors as president of the Freedom Foundation of Denmark. He was director of the Danish Cancer Society.

== Early life ==
Jørgen Kieler, the son of a physician of Jutland, studied medicine with his sister Elsebet in England, France, Germany, and Copenhagen. His four siblings included Elsebet, Flemming, and Bente.

== Occupied Denmark ==
Kieler and his sister Elsebet were roommates in a Copenhagen apartment when the Germans invaded Denmark in 1940. Denmark and Germany signed a treaty of nonaggression on 31 May 1939, and with a small population of Nazi sympathizers, Kieler had hoped his country would not be invaded, until he was awakened by the sound of low-flying planes over Copenhagen on 9 April 1940.

Kieler came to realize what other Danes were thinking about being an occupied country, their only chance was to either support the German regime or become resistance fighters. This became clear after Germany attacked the Soviet Union on 22 June 1941, and Nazis had Danish authorities round up and arrest Danish Communists, solely because they were communists. A few months later, in September, Denmark signed the Anti-Comintern Pact with Germany. Kieler—along with his brother Flemming and sisters Elsebet and Bente—participated in a student-led protest in Copenhagen. By December 1942, Kieler had finished his pre-clinical studies at the University of Copenhagen. By that time, Frit Danmark (Free Denmark), an illegal newspaper published months of newspapers. In the spring of 1943, Kieler and his sister Elsebet then began to publish the newspaper and books in their apartment, which helped to rally anti-war sentiment and sabotage actions.

== Danish resistance fighter ==
As a member of the Holger Danske resistance group, he helped hundreds of Danish Jews to escape to Sweden and avoid extermination.

After two factories had been bombed, the Gestapo learned of some of the members of group 2 of the Holger Danske fighters (HD2) from an informer. They killed one man from HD2, Peer Borup, and four others were arrested, including Jørgen and his brother Flemming Kieler. During capture and then interrogation, Jørgen received a minor fracture of his spine due to a bullet shot through his neck and his skull was fractured by the butt of a gun. After the Gestapo completed their interrogation, Jørgen was sent to a German prison in Copenhagen. Two of Jørgen's sisters were arrested in Copenhagen just before they were to flee to Sweden and Jørgen's father was arrested in Horsens. Only his youngest sister and his mother were not imprisoned. Most of the remaining HD2 fighters went to Sweden, except Hviid which curtailed their sabotage in February 1944, but there was greater focus on eliminating informers. Hviid was particularly driven to find and kill informers.

Keiler met up with Svend Otto Nielsen in the Copenhagen prison. Nielsen was unable to move out of bed due to his broken leg and he was in a poor state, he had no means to go to the toilet or wash himself and he had not had medical treatment for three months. On a few occasions, Kieler was able to carry him outside and to the toilet. Nielsen was executed in April 1944. On 21 May 1944, Jørgen Kieler smuggled the last letter written by condemned resistance fighter Georg Quistgaard out of prison.

In June 1944, Kieler won his case after it has been determined that there was no signature on the confession that implicated Kieler, and that the incident that he had been arrested for was conducted by someone else, Marius Fiil, an innkeeper, and seven more people of the Hvidsten Group were arrested and quickly executed. They had picked up and distributed weapons that were parachuted into Denmark by the Royal Air Force. He was still due to be executed, though, which was curtailed following a general strike in Copenhagen. Kieler met up with his father and oldest sister in a Nazi concentration camp in Denmark after he had been departed from the prison. He met up with his brother Flemming when he was sent to Porta Westphalia concentration camp in Germany. They were put to work blasting through Westphalia mountain to build a town with railroads and factories, since the Allied forces were bombing important factories above ground. About one half of the 200 Danish people died due to disease, primarily tuberculosis, starvation, as well as exhaustion and as the result of beatings. Kieler and other imprisoned people suffered from starvation and the degradation of their health as a result.

Kieler was saved by the White Buses of the Bernadotte rescue. Reunited with his family, he found that his parents and siblings survived the war, although Kieler and his brother needed two years of care. Jørgen was treated for tuberculosis and Flemming for other diseases.

== After the war ==
Despite capture by the Germans and time in a concentration camp, he returned to Denmark after the war and then completed his studies in the United States.

He became director of the Danish Cancer Society (Kræftens Bekæmpelse). Kieler wrote a number of books about the German occupation and about concentration camp syndrome, including,Hvorfor gjorde I det? : personlige erindringer fra besættelsestiden i historisk belysning [Why did you do it? : Personal Memories from the Occupation in a Historical Light] (in Danish) (1st ed.). Gyldendal. 2001. ISBN 8700751480. He supported Danish concentration camp survivors as president of the Freedom Foundation in Denmark.

His story is told at the Museum of Danish Resistance in Copenhagen, alongside four other figures from the time period as part of an interactive exhibition.

On 19 February 2017, Kieler died at age 97.

== Sources ==
- Goldberger, Leo (1987). The rescue of the Danish Jews : moral courage under stress. New York University Press. pp. 148–149. ISBN 978-0-8147-3010-2.
