= Bent Faurschou Hviid =

Danish resistance member (1921–1944)

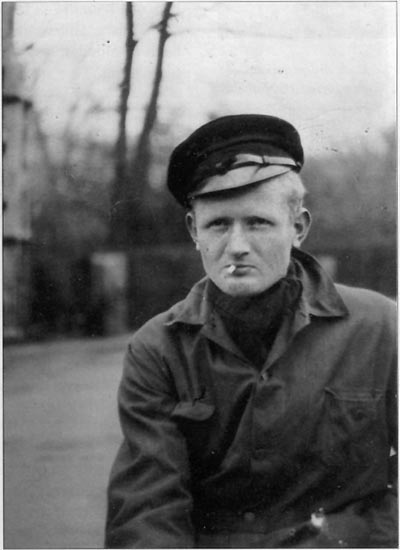
- Bent Faurschou Hviid in 1944
- Born: 7 January 1921; Asserbo, Denmark
- Died: 18 October 1944 (aged 23); Gentofte, Denmark
- Occupation: resistance fighter

Bent Faurschou Hviid (7 January 1921 – 18 October 1944) was a member of the Danish resistance group Holger Danske during World War II. He was quickly named "Flammen" (meaning "The Flame"), for his red hair. In 1951, he and his Resistance partner Jørgen Haagen Schmith ("The Lemon", or Citronen in Danish), were posthumously awarded the United States Medal of Freedom by President Harry Truman.

According to several colleagues from the Holger Danske, no other resistance member was as hated or sought by the Germans as was Faurschou Hviid. Gunnar Dyrberg, leader of the Holger Danske from 1943 through 1945, said in the 2003 Danish documentary film, With a Right to Kill (Med ret til at dræbe), that no one knows exactly how many executions The Flame performed, but he was rumoured to have killed 22 persons. The film explored the issues of the estimated 400 executions performed by the Resistance agents.

== Early life ==
Bent Faurschou Hviid was born in 1921 in Asserbo, Denmark, on the island of Zealand to Marie Louise Larsen and Wilhelm Faurschou Hviid. His father was the owner of Asserbo's Birkegården Hotel. He also had a sister, Marie-Louise Swanstrøm and a brother Jan Faurschou Hviid.

== World War II ==
Faurschou Hviid came of age during the war, and was 20 when the Germans occupied Denmark. He entered the Holger Danske resistance group in Copenhagen. He was assigned to kill Danish Nazi officials and collaborators.

"Flammen" regularly partnered with "Citronen" whose real name was Jørgen Haagen Schmith. "Citronen" means "the lemon". Schmith got this nickname because he sabotaged a Citroën garage, destroying six German cars and a tank. He generally drove for Flammen, who executed their given targets. Together, Flammen and Citronen formed the most famous resistance duo in Denmark during World War II. The Germans put the highest bounty on Flammen's head that they offered for any Resistance fighter.

According to Gunnar Dyrberg, leader of the Holger Danske from 1943 to 1945, who spoke in the Danish documentary film With a Right to Kill (Med ret til at dræbe, 2003), Flammen was believed to have executed 22 persons. The film was based on the book Efter drabet (Following the Death, 2001) by journalist Peter Øvig Knudsen, who also co-wrote the screenplay.

== Death ==
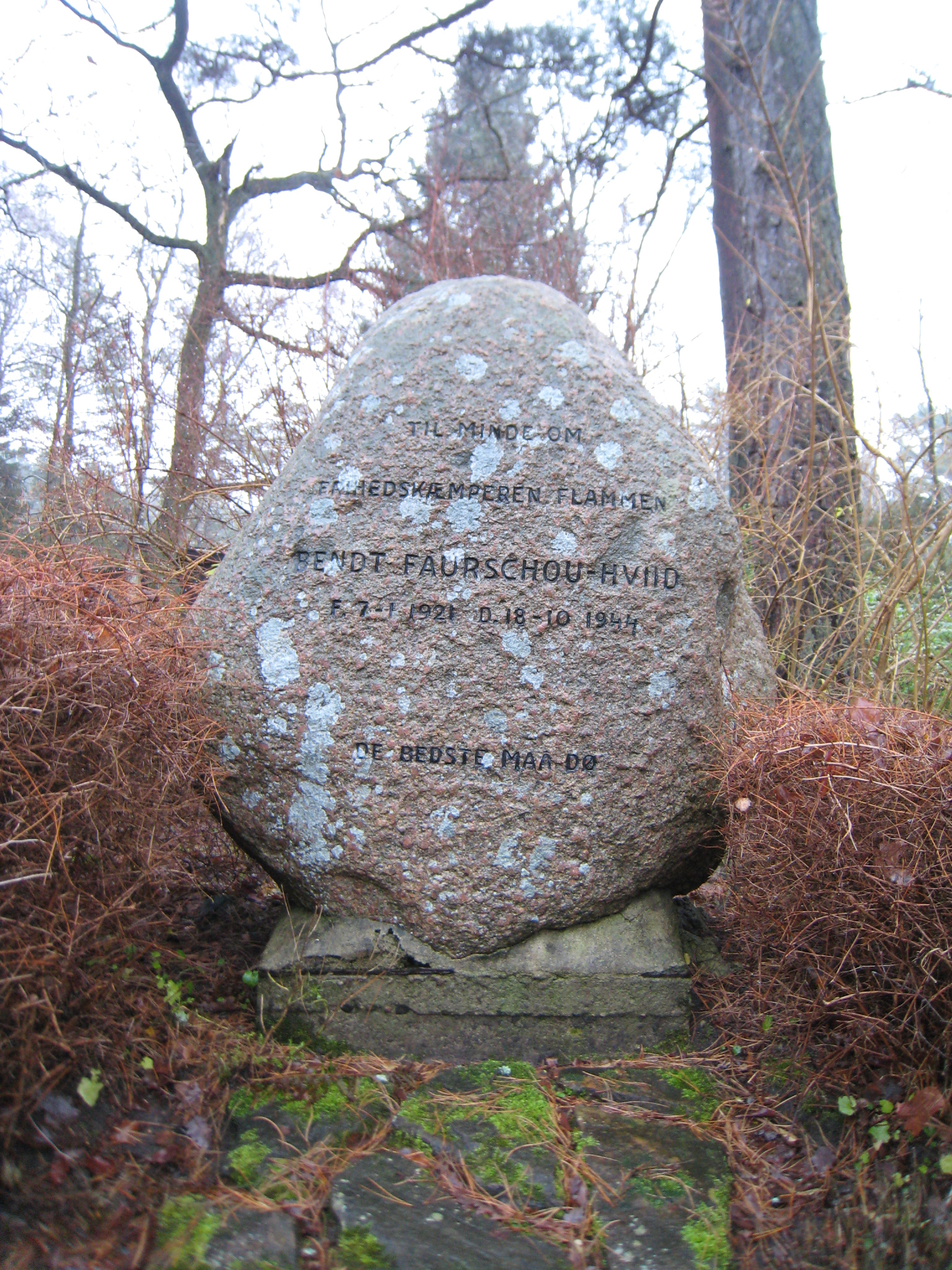
The memorial of Faurschou Hviid. The inscription translated reads "IN MEMORY OF THE FREEDOM FIGHTER 'FLAMMEN' BENDT FAURSCHOU-HVIID BORN 7-1 1921 DIED 18-10 1944 THE BEST MUST DIE".

On 18 October 1944, Faurschou Hviid was having dinner with his landlady and some guests when someone knocked at the door and a German officer demanded entry. Faurschou Hviid, who was unarmed that evening, quickly went upstairs seeking to escape across the roof. He soon realised that the house was completely surrounded. With no escape possible, he chewed a cyanide capsule and was dead a few seconds later.

The witnesses later told of how they could hear the German soldiers upstairs cheering at the sight of the corpse. The soldiers dragged Faurschou Hviid downstairs feet first, repeatedly causing his head to bang against the stairs.

== Legacy ==
- In 1951, Faurschou Hviid and his colleague Jørgen Haagen Schmith were presented, posthumously, with the US Medal of Freedom by President Harry Truman.
- The Danish documentary film, With a Right to Kill (Med ret til at dræbe, 2003), explored some of the ambiguity related to decisions about liquidating targets, and suggested that Flammen may have been directed by a double agent in some of his executions. (This moral complexity was reflected in the 2008 drama discussed below.)
- In 2008, Faurschou Hviid and Schmith were memorialized by one of the most expensive Danish films premiered to date (as of October 2009). The title was Flame & Citron, and the film was successful in terms of box office receipts. Faurschou Hviid is played by Thure Lindhardt and Schmith by Mads Mikkelsen.
