= Jens Lillelund =

Danish resistance leader and fighter during World War II (1904–1981)

- Born: 22 October 1904; Lime, Denmark
- Died: July 10, 1981 (aged 76); Gentofte, Denmark
- Resting place: Ordrup Cemetery, Denmark
- Other names: Cover names: Finn, Finsen, Koch, Koch-Finsen, Krølle, Mørck, S.50, Varberg
- Occupations: Salesman, businessman, assistant professor
- Known for: Resistance leader and saboteur during World War II

Jens Lillelund (22 October 1904 – 10 July 1981) was a Danish resistance leader and fighter during World War II (1939–1945), including working with the Special Operations Executive (SOE), a secret British organization. His activities included contributing to a resistance publication, sabotage, rescuing Jews, managing logistics, and military training. He was a founder of the Holger Danske resistance organization. The size of the group fluctuated as some were killed or arrested, and the remaining resistance fighters went into hiding. It grew to have more than 300 members. He developed alliances with other Danish resistance groups and the British military which provided a means to obtain weapons and explosives.

For his service during World War II, he received the British King's Medal for Courage in the Cause of Freedom and King Christian X's commemorative medal for participation in the war 1940–45.

== Personal life and education ==
Lillelund was born on 22 October 1904 in Lime, Denmark to Laura Kirstine Nielsen (1870–1932) and Jens Peter L. (1875–1922), who was a farmer and a member of the Parliament of Denmark. He attended a boarding school in Bagsværd and then was educated in banking and business.

Lillelund married Ena Kjærbye, daughter of Johanne Augusta Allin (1882–1949) and Oluf Rasmus K. (1875–1932), head treasurer. They were married in Gladaxe on 22 January 1932. He lived in Blidahpark, Hellerup, Copenhagen; other places in Denmark; Stockholm, Sweden; and England.

Lillelund died on 10 July 1981 in Gentofte, and was interred at Ordrup Cemetery.

== Career ==
After college, Lillelund was a sales manager in Copenhagen at an American company. Lillelund worked in Copenhagen and throughout Denmark as a salesman, businessman, director, and assistant professor. When Germans invaded Denmark (1940), Lillelund worked in sales for a cash register company.

After the war, Lillelund established a company. He was a public speaker known for his reputation as a freedom fighter and the chairman of organizations such as the Danish Israel Society, Denmark's Committee for Soviet Jews, and The League for Tolerance.

== World War II ==
Germany invaded Denmark on 9 April 1940. Distressed by the events, Lillelund went to a unit of Nazi soldiers and exhibited "highly provocative behavior" by "openly exhibiting his contempt" for the invading troops. He was arrested that day. After he was released, he became a resistance fighter, first with an attempt at sabotage by dropping homemade bombs into German trucks. He worked for the magazine De frie Danske (The Free Danes), which was an illegal publication aligned with the Danish resistance movement group Borgerlige Partisaner (BOPA). Founded by Josef Søndergaard and Carl Munck, the publication was later associated with The Ring and Danish Unity.

Lillelund then became an active saboteur. With Joseph Søndergaard, Lillelund co-founded and led Holger Danske, named after Holger Danske, and Holger Danske II resistance organizations during World War II. He was a chief, liaison officer, and secretary.

He furthered his sabotage capabilities after he met a group of paratroopers in June 1943. Through them, Lillelund came in contact with Special Operations Executive (SOE). He met Commander R. Hollingworth of the British Navy who became chief of special forces in Denmark. Holger Danske then received explosives and weapons from the Royal Air Force.

Lillelund's resistance activities included intelligence as well as factories, railroad, German planes and vehicles, and other sabotage, including the August 1943 attack on the Forum Copenhagen. The Germans had planned to repurpose the exhibition hall for barracks. Six other men, including Søndergaard, participated in the attack, which was profound. Lillelund and other resistance fighters escaped to Sweden for safety.

Holger Danske's members, which grew to 300 and more members, included marksmen and bombing experts. They were subject to arrest and assassination, which caused some of the rest of the members to escape. As a result, the group disbanded at times.

Lillelund remembered Svend Otto Nielsen's feelings about working underground while at the apartment of Hedvig Delbo, who was later found to be the Gestapo operative who informed on him,

I hope I survive the war. I've been living underground so long that I can't remember what it was like not to be afraid. I’m always afraid. I’m scared every time a car pulls up outside the door or somebody comes up the stairs. I go cold if a man looks a bit too hard at me in a restaurant as I get up to pay my bill. It would be wonderful to walk around without having to be frightened of anything. I'd like to get back to my school and go hunting with my brot'er, the forester. But how big is the chance? Fifty-fifty? I don't know, but I suppose my chance is better than yours because you're so well-known. I don't think you’ll get through, but it's just possible I might...

Lillelund helped reorganize the group of resistance fighters to meet the needs of the time, such as when they found out that the Germans planned to deport all Danish Jews to concentration camps in October 1943 during Rosh Hasanna (Jewish New Year). When Lillelund heard of the deportation plans, he and his wife identified Jewish-sounding names from the Copenhagen telephone book to warn them. He reorganized Holger Danske, collaborating with the Danish Unity, SOE, and the Freedom Council. Lillelund worked on logistics and rescue efforts to bring Danish Jews to safety in Sweden. Over the course of the war, members of Holger Danske killed 200 informers.

Lillelund went to Sweden in December 1943 when he learned of the Germans' imminent plans to kill him. A female informer for the Nazis had identified Lillelund and Svend Otto Nielsen, leader of another resistance group. Nielsen was arrested and then executed. Lillelund escaped to Sweden where he was a contact committee member until he returned to Copenhagen in June 1944. In the meantime, Jørgen Staffeldt, a representative of the Freedom Council, ran the Holger Danske organization in Lillelund's absence. Staffeldt was captured and sent to a concentration camp, where he died.

Upon his return, Lillelund reorganized the group and its affiliations. It collaborated with Frode Jakobsen's Ringen, or Ring. By breaking off ties to the Danish Ring, Holger Danske had more clout with the Freedom Council. Meanwhile, Danes engaged in general strikes as another tactic against the Nazis. Holger Dansk began to train its members to fight to reclaim Denmark from Nazi Germany beginning in the summer of 1944.

Lillelund, in league with Anton Toldstrup, head of reception, organized sabotage groups in Jutland. He returned to Sweden after he and Toldstrup found working with Vagn Bennike, the military leader in Jutland, too difficult. He worked with the contact committee again. Lillelund went to England for military training in the spring of 1945. He returned to Denmark on 7 May 1945 as a liaison officer to General Dewing. He attained the rank of lieutenant in the British Army.

== Publications ==
- Lillelund, Lt. Jens (1946). "The Sabotage in Denmark". In Borge Outze (ed.). Denmark During the German Occupation. Copenhagen: The Scandinavian Publishing Company.

== Honours ==
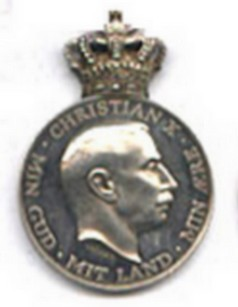
King Christian X's commemorative medal for participation in the war 1940–1945

- Medal of Freedom, Foreign to British Army, announced in the London Gazette on 17 September 1948
- King Christian X's commemorative medal for participation in the war 1940–45

== Bibliography ==
- Thomas, John (1976). The giant-killers : the story of the Danish resistance movement, 1940-1945. New York : Taplinger Pub. Co. ISBN 978-0-8008-3258-2.
