= Tom Stempel =

American film scholar and critic (born 1941)

Tom Stempel (born 1941) is an American film scholar and critic. He is a Professor Emeritus in Film at Los Angeles City College, where he taught from 1971 to 2011.

His students at LACC included writer director, Maggie Greenwald and Karen Moncrieff, directors Tamra Davis and Emmy-award winning Mimi Leder, film editors Carole Kravitz and Academy Award-nominated Kevin Tent, Academy Award-winning short filmmaker Ron Ellis, and Rick Schmidlin who received The New York Film Critics Circle award for the re-edit of Touch of Evil. An expert and teacher of screenwriting, he has written for Film Quarterly, Los Angeles Times, Sight & Sound, Film & History, Senses of Cinema, Slant Magazine, and has contributed to the Journal of Screenwriting.

== Books ==
He is the author of books such as Screenwriter: the Life and Times of Nunnally Johnson, FrameWork: A History of Screenwriting in the American Film, Storytellers to the Nation: A History of American Television Writing, and Understanding Screenwriting: Learning from Good, Not-Quite-So-Good, and Bad Screenplays. Philip Dunne, the screenwriter of How Green Was My Valley, said in this Foreword to FrameWork that the book was "the definitive work on the history of screenwriting." According to Ian Scott, Stempel's book FrameWork "sets out a number of reasons that a wave of playwrights, journalists, and short-story writers made their way to Hollywood, principally from New York, in the late 1920s and early '30s".

Other film historians who have acknowledged Stempel's influence in the field and in their research include Ally Acker, Douglas Heil, Claus Tieber, Steven Maras, Steven Price, and Jill Nelmes and Jule Selbo. Since 2008 Stempel has written the on-line column "Understanding Screenwriting," in which he reviews new movies, old movies, and television from the screenwriting perspective. From 2008 to 2013, it appeared in Slant Magazine/House Next Door, and from 2013 to 2017 on at www.creativescreenwiting.com. From 2018 it has been at scriptmag.com.

In 2023 Tom Stempel was awarded the inaugural Lifetime Achievement Award for Services to Screenwriting Research, presented by an international organization, the Screenwriting Research Network.

== Selected articles ==
- Let's Hear It For Eastwood's 'Strong Women: Los Angeles Times Sunday Calendar Magazine, March 11, 1984.
- The Sennett Screenplays,: Sight and Sound, Winter 1985.
- Rear Window: A John Michael Hayes Film: Creative Screenwriting, Winter 1997.
- The Collaborative Dog: Wag the Dog: Film & History Volume 35.1.
- Talking Back to Documentaries:
- Darryl F. Zanuck: 19th Century Fox Senses of Cinema, Issue 55, July 11, 2010.
- Tim Holt and the B western: Offscreen.com, November 2013.
- Filling up the glass: A Look at the Historiography of Screenwriting: The Journal of Screenwriting, Volume 5.2.
