= Holger Danske (resistance group) =

Danish resistance group during World War II

- Dates active: 1943-1945
- Groups: HD I, II, III, IV and V.
- Size: 350
- Part of: Danish resistance movement
- Wars: World War II

Holger Danske (Danish pronunciation: [ˈhʌlˀkɐ ˈtænskə]) was a Danish resistance group during World War II. It was among the largest Danish resistance groups and consisted of around 350 volunteers towards the end of the war. The group carried out sabotage operations, including blowing up railway lines strategically important to the Germans. Among their largest sabotage actions was the blowing up of the Forum Copenhagen in 1943. Holger Danske was responsible for around 200 killings of informers who had revealed the identity and/or the whereabouts of members of the resistance. The group was named after the legendary Danish hero Holger Danske (Ogier the Dane).

== Organisation ==
The resistance group Holger Danske was founded in Denmark during World War II. It was named after Holger Danske, a heroic figure who "sleeps until Denmark is in danger". Established in April 1943, its leaders included Josef Søndergaard, its "central figure", Jens Lillelund, and brothers Jorgen and Mogens Staffeldt. It was headquartered on Kongens Nytorv at the Nordisk Bookshop. The group, which had 350 or 400 members by the war's end, carried out sabotage attacks against the Germans.

For the initial several months, Holger Danske obtained explosives and training from the Danish resistance movement group Borgerlige Partisaner (BOPA), a Socialist organisation. Between the two groups, BOPA was smaller and more disciplined. Holger Danske was more democratic. The organisation was then associated with the British Special Operations Executive (SOE) and the Freedom Council that coordinated efforts with Holger Danske and the Danish resistance movement group BOPA.

== Activities in 1943 ==
After April 1943, Holger Danske and BOPA had become well-trained groups of saboteurs who made Germans less effective by bombing shipyards and factories that supplied the German military. By that time, most Danish citizens realised the effectiveness of sabotage in thwarting Germany's efforts.

Holger Danske bombed the Forum Copenhagen on 24 August 1943 by delivering bottles of Tuborg lager packed on top of plastic explosives. The Germans had planned to use the exhibition hall for barracks. Søndergaard was badly injured and most of the men involved in bombing the forum fled to Sweden for safety.

Two new groups of resistance fighters were formed after August 1943. One was a lieutenants group of about 20 men, including Bob Ramsing, cadet officer at the Danish Lieutenants School. Another was a group of medical students and naval cadets that included Flemming and Jørgen Kieler.

As resistance groups became more effective, Joachim von Ribbentrop (Nazi Minister for Foreign Affairs during World War II) ordered a state of emergency in Denmark. He wanted to declare martial law, outlaw strikes, and impose a death penalty for sabotage but was unsuccessful. The Danes maintained some control when Nils Svenningsen led Danish civil servants in running the country under the direction of the Germans.

== Nazis' deportation plan ==
Most of the Danish Jews were rescued and transported to Sweden in October 1943. Danes implemented a general strike in June 1944, after which resistance significantly increased.

== Executions and arrests ==
Ten Holger Danske and BOPA resistance fighters traveled on Roskildevej on 9 August 1944 when they were murdered.

The Gestapo "conducted a long series of arrests" of Holger Danske fighters, including Nordisk Boghandel and brothers Morgens and Jørgen Staffeldt. A total of 64 members were executed during the occupation. Holger Danske killed about 200 informers or people that were otherwise a risk.

== Reorganisation ==
Egil Barfod, assisted by Lieutenant Knud Gamst-Pedersen, recruited more members and ran the group. In the spring of 1944, one of the members of BOPA left the organisation. He and two BOPA groups joined Holger Danske. Hans Edvard Teglers and Spraeng Schmidt, both of whom had been with BOPA, became members of the resistance group.

Lillelund returned from Sweden in June 1944 to run Holger Danske and conduct sabotage attacks in Jutland. Other leaders were Christian Kisling, Police Sergeant O. B. Bertelsen, and Knud Larsen, as head of the salvage corps station, administration, and logistics. Holger Danske began to work with Frode Jakobsen's Ringen while discontinuing their association with Dansk Samling, which gave them more clout with the Freedom Council. Lillelund met with leaders of the Freedom Council and BOPA to develop a plan to use flying squads to leave a site after sabotage quickly. They also created a plan for the use of safe houses. Lillelund joined a Parachute Regiment as a lieutenant in England.

== Activities in 1944 ==
After a general strike in the summer of 1944, there was a lull in sabotage activities while members began to train for military action against the Germans. With about 300 fighters, Holger Danske was organised into a military structure of sections, companies, and divisions. It was run by a council of five men, with Police Sergeant Harald Petersen leading the group. Holger Danske became very active in military and sabotage efforts and was then the country's largest sabotage group.

Its efforts became more consequential following the Normandy landings (Operation Overlord) in June 1944. In Jutland and the provinces, Holger Danske sabotaged rail lines that had been used to transport people and equipment from Germany to Denmark and Norway. As the Germans planned their activities, they coordinated their efforts with the Danish State Railways (DSB), which informed the resistance organisation. The attacks by Holger Danske were targeted to thwart Germany's military movements. Holger Danske's sabotage became more targeted and effective through coordination with the British, including Lieutenant Colonel Vagn Bennike's plan that relayed strategic information through coded messages on Danish broadcasts of the British Broadcasting Corporation (BBC).

More men from the group were killed or arrested, which made them subject to torture and being sent to Nazi concentration camps.

== Members ==
Jens Lillelund was an organiser of the group, carrying out 50 sabotage attacks in Jutland. He escaped to Sweden during dangerous periods and returned to Denmark to coordinate resistance activities. He became a liaison officer to British General Dewing on 7 May 1945 after receiving military training in England beginning in November 1944.

Two of the members of Holger Danske were Jørgen Haagen Schmith and Bent Faurschou Hviid, who became famous under their aliases, Citronen (the Lemon) and Flammen (the Flame). Both led numerous sabotage operations in 1943 and 1944. They were portrayed in the 2008 movie Flammen og Citronen by Thure Lindhardt and Mads Mikkelsen. One member of the group, Lis Mellemgaard, survived the war as she remained at home with a sore throat when her colleagues were rounded up and executed in March 1945. The author Arne Sørensen was a member of the group. After the war, he was involved in the nation's reconstruction as a politician.

Jørgen Kieler was arrested and was sent to a concentration camp. He survived the war, became a cancer researcher, and a public speaker about Danish resistance during World War II.

A woman named Klinting had worked for German employers and was a saboteur who obtained and destroyed plans for new Luftwaffe aircraft. She was arrested and imprisoned at Vestre Fængsel. Klinting was transferred to a hospital after feigning madness. Jorgen Staffeldt tried to have her released through a group of doctors. The day before she was to be deported to Germany, she was rescued by resistance fighters.

Gunnar Dyrberg joined Holger Danske, with the code name Bob Herman. His activities as a liquidator are described in his autobiographical book De ensomme Ulve (The Lonely Wolves).

== Commemoration ==
=== Monuments and memorials ===
The Holger Danske Monument was inaugurated on Julius Thomsens Plads in Frederiksberg in 2026. It consists of a statue of Max Bæklund with a beer crate full of explosives, a reference to the Holger Danske Group's sabotage against the adjacent Forum Building. During the German occupation of Denmark, Holger Danske had become aware that the Germans intended to use the building for quartering 1,500 soldiers. On 24 August 1943, Max Bæklund blew up the building. He had dressed up as a bicycle courier and the 27 kg of explosives were hidden in a beer crate. The statue was created by Joakim Zacho Weyland. It was unveiled on 9 April 2026 (86th anniversary of the occupation of Denmark).

A plaque above the main entrance of Overgaden neden Vandet 51B in Christianshavn states that the Holger Danske group was founded on the site. Members of Holger Danske met in the medical doctor Hans Keiser-Nielsen's apartment on the third floor. The commemorative plaque was installed at Keiser-Nielsen's initiative and unveiled on 4 May 1985 (40th anniversary of the liberation of Denmark). However, after its installation, surviving members of the group have pointed out that the group was not founded in Kauser-Nielsen's apartment but a book room of the radio shop Stjerne Radio on Istedgade in Vesterbro.

The small building where Stjerne Radio was based at Istedgade 31 was demolished in the 1970s. The façade of the shop was recreated in 2015. The display window features an exhibition about the Holger Danske Group's use of the premises and the August Riots in 1943.

On the façade of Skindergade 44 is a black stone plaque underneath a cone-shaped stone bearing the names of seven Holger Danske members who were arrested there by the Gestapo in 1945 and subsequently executed in Ryvangen. The inscription on the black stone reads:

Den 26. Februar 1945
Blev Disse Frihedskæmpere
Fra Holger Danske-Gruppen
Taget af Gestapo i Dette Hus
Den 17. Marts 1945 Blev de
Henrettet i Ryvangen

Translation:

On February 26, 1945
These Freedom Fighters
From the Holger Danish Group
Were taken by the Gestapo in this house
On March 17, 1945, they were
Executed in Ryvangen

The names of the seven men listed on the cone-shaped stone are Hans Brahe Salling, Svend Borup Jensen, Leo Christensen, Georg Stougaard, Jørn Andersen. Ole Mosolff and Kaj Ohlsen.

A plaque commemorating Bent Faurschou Hviid ("The Flame") has been installed on the façade of Strandvejen 184 in Charlottenlund. A plaque commemorating the teacher Svend Otto Nielsen has been installed on the façade of Skovshoved School in Skovshoved north of Copenhagen. He was subject to torture in the Gestapo headquarters at Dagmarhus after being arrested but did not disclose information about any of the other members of the group.

=== Film and television ===
The 2008 historical drama film Flame & Citron tells the story of the two namesake Holger Danske members during World War II.

== See also ==
- Atlas A/S, where weapons were secretly made for Holger Danske during World War II
- Cheminova, factory sabotaged by Holger Danske on 2 January 1945

== Bibliography ==
- Holbraad, Carsten (2017). Danish Reactions to German Occupation. UCL Press.
- Thomas, John (1976). The giant-killers : the story of the Danish resistance movement, 1940-1945. New York : Taplinger Pub. Co. ISBN 978-0-8008-3258-2.
- Thomas, Alastair H. (1998). Historical dictionary of Denmark. Lanham, Md. : Scarecrow Press. p. 220. ISBN 978-0-8108-3544-3.
