= Thure Lindhardt =

Danish actor (born 1974)

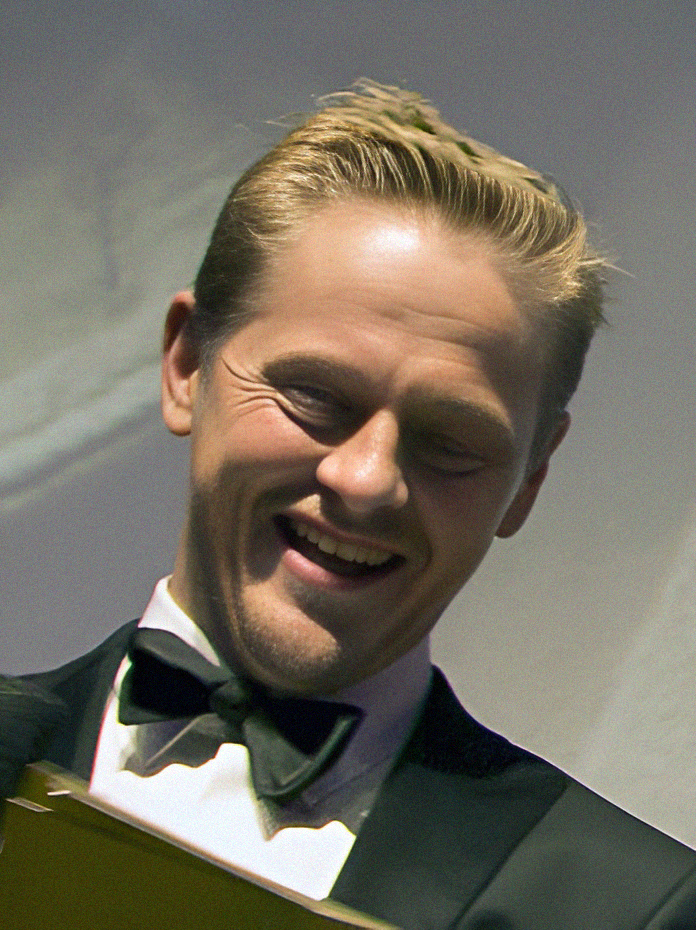
- Lindhardt in 2017
- Born: 24 December 1974 (age 51); Copenhagen, Denmark
- Occupation: Actor
- Years active: 1987–present

Thure Frank Lindhardt (Danish: [ˈtsʰuːɐ ˈle̝nˌhɑːt]; born 24 December 1974) is a Danish actor.

== Life and career ==
Lindhardt grew up in Roskilde. At the age of 12, he got a part in Bille August's film Pelle the Conqueror. He was educated at the drama school at Odense Theatre in 1998. His breakthrough in Denmark came with his portrayal of a boy with autism in A Place Nearby, co-starring with Ghita Nørby.

Since then, he has played parts in a variety of movies and series, including Into the Wild, Angels in Fast Motion aka Nordkraft, Brotherhood, Love in Thoughts, Sugar Rush, Princess, Rejseholdet, Byzantium and Flame & Citron, a film about the World War II resistance group Holger Danske, in which Lindhardt played Bent Faurschou-Hviid, co-starring with Mads Mikkelsen.

He also played a role as the young Swiss Guard Lieutenant Chartrand in the 2009 film Angels & Demons, directed by Ron Howard.

He co-starred in Ira Sachs's film Keep the Lights On, which premiered at the Sundance Film Festival in January 2012. Later in 2012, he was nominated for a Gotham Independent Film Award for Breakthrough Actor as well as an Independent Spirit Award for Best Male Lead.

In the third season of Showtime's The Borgias, Lindhardt starred opposite Jeremy Irons, playing Rufio, a ruthless assassin working under Catherina Sforza (portrayed by Gina McKee) to bring about the Borgias' downfall.

In 2012, Lindhardt played a role in the European-Scandinavian TV series The Spiral, and in 2013 he appeared in the feature film Adieu Paris.

In 2014, he received the Lauritzen Award.

In 2015, he played the Danish detective Henrik Sabroe opposite Sofia Helin in season 3 of the Danish-Swedish TV police series The Bridge. He replaced Kim Bodnia as a lead. He reprised the role in the show's fourth and final season, broadcast in early 2018.

== Personal life ==
In May 2010, he broke up with Silas Holst, his boyfriend of two years. In 2017, he became a father to a daughter.

== Filmography ==
Year	Title	Role	Notes
1987	Negerkys og labre larver	Postbud	
1987	Pelle the Conqueror	Student	
2000	Her i nærheden	Brian	
2000	Juliane	Cykellærling	
2001	Far from China	Jeremy	
2002	One Hell of a Christmas	Mike	
2002	Slim Slam Slum	Slim	
2002	Nude, Descending...	RW	
2002	Unit One	Kore	2 episodes
2004	Love in Thoughts	Hans	
2004	Farland	Julian	
2005	Nordkraft	Steso	
2005	Bag det stille ydre	Charlie	
2006	Princess	August	Voice
2007	Pistoleros	Krelle	
2007	Into the Wild	Mads	
2007	Daisy Diamond	Actor	
2008	Reise nach Amerika		
2008	Flame & Citron	Bent Faurschou-Hviid / Flammen	
2008	Blå mænd	Jesper Jensen	
2008	Lille soldat	John	
2009	Angels & Demons	Lieutenant Chartrand	
2009	De vilde svaner	Prins Albrecht	
2009	Brotherhood	Lars	
2009	Julefrokosten	Frans	
2010	Truth About Men	Mads	
2011	Freddy Frogface	Victor	Voice
2011	The Island	Daneel	
2011	Liebe am Fjord – Das Ende der Eiszeit	Henrik Sörenbrandt	
2012	Keep the Lights On	Erik Rothman	
2012	Formentera	Benno	
2012	Eddie: The Sleepwalking Cannibal	Lars	
2012	Gummi T	Ivan Olsen	Voice
2012	Byzantium	Werner	
2013	3096 Days	Wolfgang Přiklopil	
2013	Fast & Furious 6	Firuz	
2013	Adieu Paris	Mika	
2013	The Borgias	Rufio	10 episodes
2014	Itsi Bitsi	Eik's Father	
2015–2018	The Bridge	Henrik Sabroe	18 episodes
2016	Despite the Falling Snow	Dimtri	
2016	Kill Command	Damien Bukes	
2017	Light Thereafter	Piri	
2017	The Last Kingdom	Guthred	4 episodes
2018	Hodja fra Pjort	Hodja	
2018	Ditte & Louise		
2018	A War Within	Hansen	
2018	X&Y		
2019	ASTRUP - Flammen over Jølster	Nikolai Astrup	
2024	Jana: Marked for Life	Leo Hansen	
