= Peter Øvig Knudsen =

Danish screenwriter and journalist

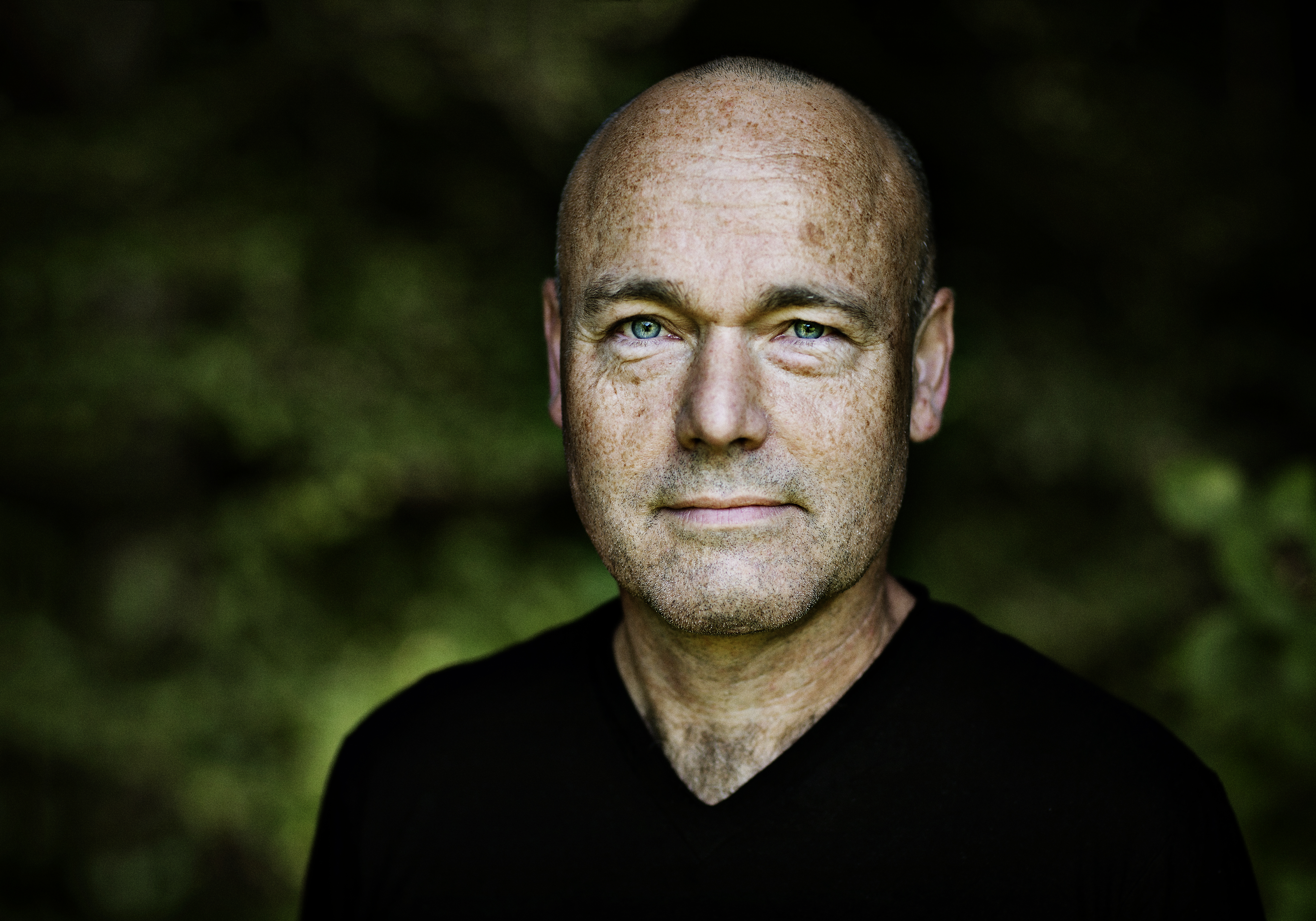
- Photo: Simon Klein Knudsen
- Born: 9 October 1961; Holme, Aarhus, Denmark
- Occupations: Biographer journalist writer film director

Peter Øvig Knudsen (born 9 October 1961) is a Danish journalist and author.

He is educated from the Danish School of Media and Journalism in 1987. He has previously worked for 'Månedsbladet Press', Dagbladet Information, Weekendavisen, and Danmarks Radio.

Since 2003 he has worked full time as a non-fiction author and film-maker.

In 2003 together with Morten Henriksen he directed the documentary Med ret til at dræbe based on the books; Efter drabet og Birkedal. In 2004 he won the Robert Award for Best Documentary Feature for the movie.

In 2007 he won the Cavlingprisen for his book series Blekingegadebanden on the Maoist criminal group The Blekinge Street Gang.

== Bibliography ==
- Er du da sindssyg (1987)
- Børn skal ikke lege under fuldmånen (1995)
- Min generation (1997)
- Passioner (1998)
- Efter drabet: beretninger om modstandskampens likvideringer (2001)
- Hilsner fra klovnen, roman (2003)
- Birkedal (2004)
- Blekingegadebanden 1. Den danske celle, ISBN 978-87-02-04369-3, (2007)
- Blekingegadebanden 2. Den hårde kerne, ISBN 978-87-02-05906-9, (2007)
- Blekingegadebanden, samlet udvidet udgave, ISBN 978-87-02-07363-8, (2008)
- Hippie 1 – Tre år og 74 dage der forandrede Danmark (2011)
- Hippie 2 – Den sidste sommer (2012)
- Nakkeskuddet – Og andre historier om at beskrive virkeligheden (2014)
- BZ – Et familiedrama (2016)
- Min mor var besat – Da jeg mødte depressionens dæmon (2019)
- Jeg er hvad jeg husker (2021)
- Dem, der ikke tier (2023)
