= BOPA =

Commmunist Danish resistance group during World War II

- Borgerlige Partisaner
- Dates active: 1942-1945
- Part of: Danish resistance movement
- Wars: World War II

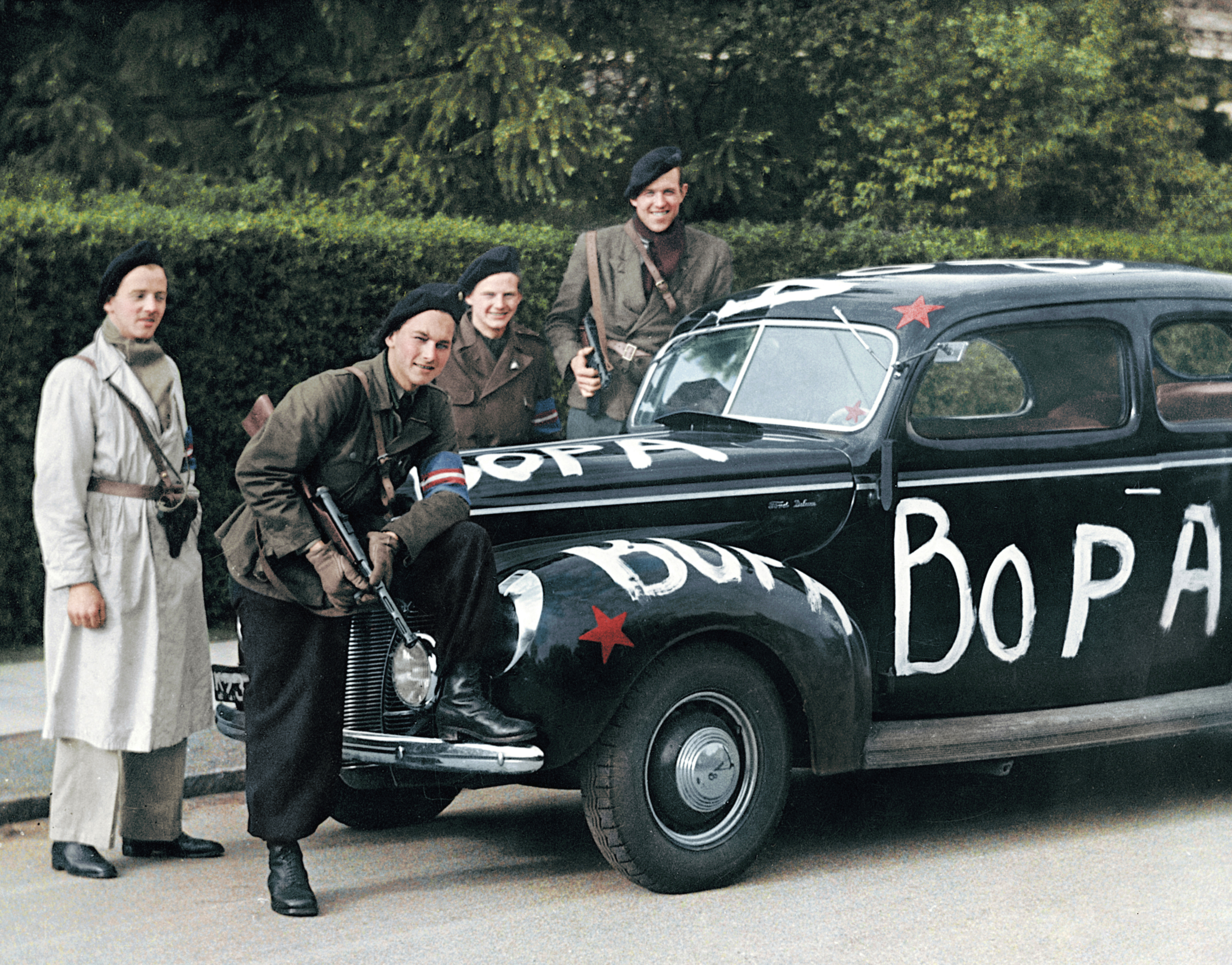
Armed BOPA members with their Ford Deluxe, Copenhagen, May 1945

BOPA (Danish: Borgerlige Partisaner, Civil Partisans) was a group of the Danish resistance movement; it was affiliated with the communists and developed after the occupation of Denmark by Nazi Germany during the Second World War.

In 1942, the Communist Party of Denmark was banned by the German authorities. Communists organized small sabotage cells across the country, formed mainly by veterans who had been part of the volunteer anti-Franco brigades of the Spanish Civil War. However, as arms were scarce, their weapons were often gasoline and matches, and only small-scale operations were carried out.

On January 25, 1943, a group of students—who had previously been refused membership in the communist resistance group due to its members' distrust of elitists (including students)—set fire to a stock of German listening devices at Dansk Industrisyndikat in Hellerup using a bottle of spirits. The students were accepted into the group, which changed its name from the original KOPA (Kommunistiske Partisaner, Communist Partisans) to Borgerlige Partisaner (Civil Partisans) or BOPA. The new name was at first used jokingly by old members, since "borgerlig" in Danish also means "conservative", but it soon became the most widely used name.

Operations grew in magnitude as individuals with inside knowledge of possible targets joined the group. Young apprentices from large factories proved especially useful in identifying targets that were supplying the German military. The cells attacked factories such as Burmeister & Wain and Riffelsyndikatet in 1943, Riffelsyndikatet (again) and Global in 1944, and Always in 1945.
