= Leo Goldberger =

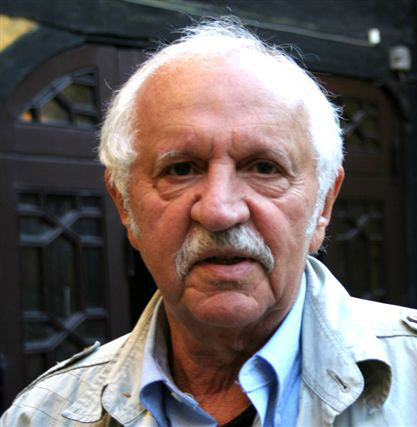
Leo Goldberger (2007)

Leo Goldberger (born June 28, 1930) is a psychologist, author, and editor known for his work in sensory deprivation, personality, stress and coping, as well as for his writings on the rescue of the Danish Jews during the Holocaust. A professor emeritus of psychology at New York University (NYU), Goldberger is a former director of its Research Center for Mental Health.

== Biography ==
Goldberger's formative years were spent in Copenhagen, Denmark, where he grew up and where he endured the German occupation, escaping by fishing boat to Sweden during the Nazi round-up of the Jews in October 1943, with the assistance of Fanny Arnskov. In 1947 he emigrated to Canada, worked as a freelancer for the Danish section of CBC's International Service in Montreal, while attending McGill University, where he studied psychology, receiving his BA in 1951. He remained there for another year of graduate work in the department of Donald O. Hebb and thus became part of the emergent research field of sensory deprivation.

In 1952 he moved to the US and worked as a member of an interdisciplinary team in the Human Ecology Program (at NY Hospital-Cornell-Medical Center) studying the stress experienced by Chinese nationals stranded in the US after the communist revolution in China. He subsequently joined the Research Center for Mental Health (RCMH) at New York University in 1956 as a research fellow, conducting experiments on personality, sensory deprivation, LSD, cognitive style and subliminal perception in collaboration with Robert R. Holt, George S. Klein and others, of the RCMH, with funding from his 5-year NIMH-Research Career Development Award among other grants. On receiving his Ph.D. in 1958, Goldberger became an assistant professor and a member of the staff of the Research Center for Mental Health, then in 1967 its associate director, and assumed the position of director in 1971 until the center's demise a few years later. On the NYU faculty he rose to associate professor, professor, and now professor emeritus.

Becoming a US citizen in 1959, he discharged his military obligation as a civilian researcher for the US Air Force, conducting simulation studies in support of the Mercury Astronaut Space Selection Program

His interest in psychoanalysis led him to the New York Psychoanalytic Institute, from which he graduated in 1967. His research and theoretical orientation consistently favored an empirical, inter-disciplinary approach and he became part of a like-minded group of psychoanalysts that established Psychoanalysis and Contemporary Thought, of which he served as editor for 27 years. He was also the founder and general editor of Psychoanalytic Crosscurrents and Essential Papers in Psychoanalysis, book series published by New York University Press. A frequent consultant to publishers, including Basic Books, Bruner-Mazel, Routledge and the Behavioral Science Book Service of the Book-Of-the-Month Club, he was also a consultant to Holocaust resource centers, and to documentary film makers. He was the story consultant on the feature film A Day in October (1992) about the rescue of the Danish Jews.

== Honors ==
The Order of Dannebrog (Knight's Cross), awarded by Queen Margrethe II of Denmark in 1993.

== Bibliography ==
Books written by Goldberger include:

- LSD: Personality and Experience with Harriet Linton Barr, Robert J. Langs, Rober R. Holt & George S. Klein. NY: Wiley Interscience, 1972
- Psychoanalysis and Contemporary Science"(Vol. 3))eds. with Victor H. Rosen. NY: International Universities Press, 1974
- Handbook of Stress with Shlomo Breznitz. NY: Free Press, 1982 (end rev. ed, 1993)
- The Rescue of the Danish Jews: Moral Courage Under Stress,(ed.) NY: New York University Press, 1987
- Ideas and Identities: The Life and Work of Erik Erikson (eds.) with Robert S. Wallerstein. Madison, Ct. International Universities Press,. 1989

== See also ==
- Sensory deprivation
- Rescue of the Danish Jews
- Stress (biology)
