= Henny Sinding Sundø =

Henny Sinding Sundø (8 August 1921 – 22 August 2008) was a Danish resistance fighter under the German occupation of Denmark in World War II. During the autumn of 1943, rumors spread throughout Denmark that the Nazis would soon begin persecuting and deporting Jews out of the country. Henny Sinding Sundø, then an apprentice at the Danish Lighthouse Service, heard about this and with the crew of the Gerda III vessel, decided to use their positions at the lighthouse to ferry Jewish families to neutral Sweden. Her actions as well as those of her colleagues saved an estimated 300-600 individuals over the course of the three-week operation.

== Early life ==
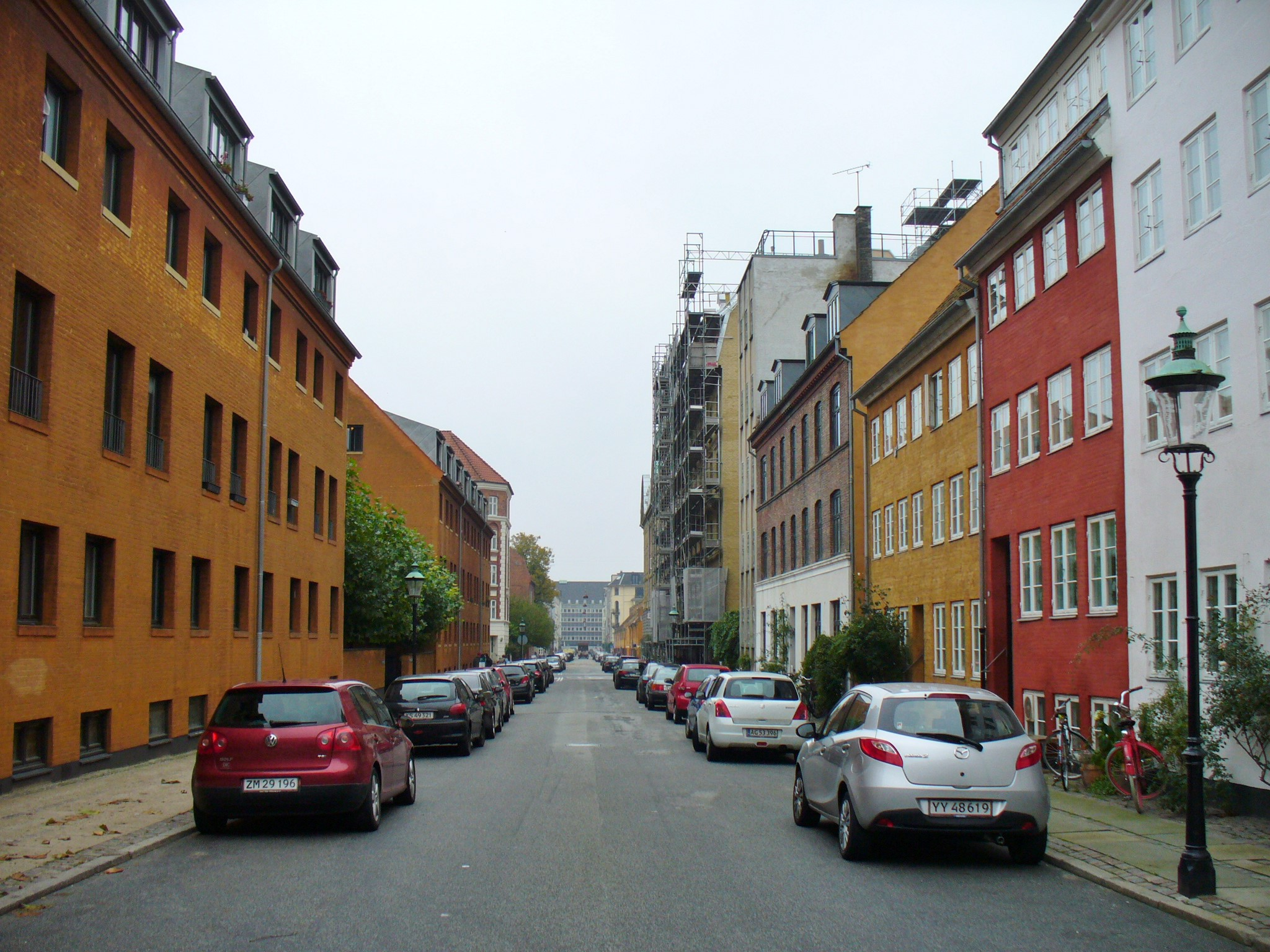
Olfert Fischers Gade, Copenhagen, Denmark

Henny Lilian Sinding Sundø was born on August 8, 1921 to Poul Edvard Bartholin Sinding and Elna Addy Sinding. Though little is known about her youth, a 1925 Danish census record reveals that she resided with her family in Olfert Fischers Gade, Copenhagen at age four. She also studied language in London several years later as a young adult. Upon her return to Denmark, Henny became an apprentice under her father at the Danish Lighthouse Services (Fyrvæsenet). It was there that she met the crew of the small work vessel Gerda III, namely Otto Andersen, John Hansen, Gerhardt Steffensen, and Einar Tønnesen.

== Historical context ==
At the onset of WWII in September 1939, the German government was relatively placid in their relationship with Denmark. However, the trust between the countries was broken on April 9th, 1940 when Denmark was invaded and occupied by German forces in a matter of hours. This led to Danish cooperation with their occupier's requests in exchange for moderate normalcy in daily life, including conducting regular business and gathering for religious services. The small Jewish population in Denmark also benefited from these agreements because the restrictions imposed on them were not the same as in other European countries, such as displaying the star of David on their clothing or abandoning their homes.

== The beginning of resistance ==
By the summer of 1943, rumors of Nazi defeat in North Africa and Italy gave Danes the impression that Germany was no longer an unbeatable force and resistance to it could provoke enduring change. Additionally, information regarding the large-scale deportation of Jews in Denmark had been leaked by SS General Werner Best to naval officer Georg Ferdinand Duckwitz and then to the general populace, prompting many average citizens (including 22-year-old Henny and the Gerda III crew) to act.

One October morning as she attended to her lighthouse duties, Henny’s crewmates approached her and quietly asked for aid in smuggling Jewish families to the Swedish coast. She agreed, and knowing the risk of the operation, asked her father, "Could you please see that Gerda III gets another key, and would you close your eyes and pretend not to notice if Gerda III doesn't sail its usual route and at the usual time? And would you inform the lighthouse master... that Gerda III will not be coming at certain hours? It will vary very much when it comes out to the lighthouse." He then, being a respected and well-known officer in the area, and perceiving the request being made, gave his silent approval.

== Logistics ==
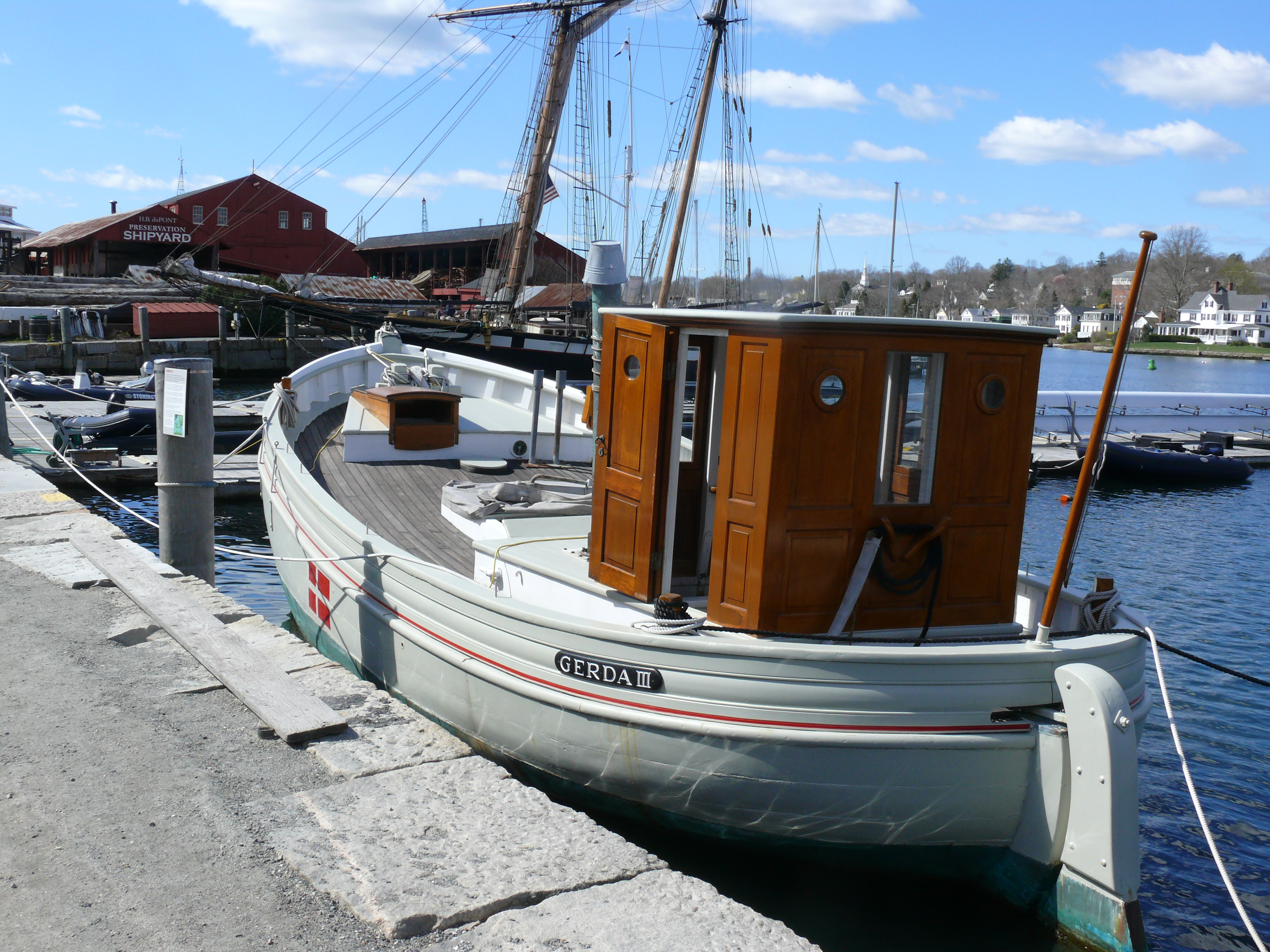
Gerda III, now located at the Mystic Seaport Museum in Mystic CT, United States

The first steps undertaken by the group were to seek out Jewish families who the crew knew personally, such as friends and neighbors living nearby, and instruct them to meet at a predetermined rendezvous point. This proved to be more difficult than expected as many Jewish families had already gone into hiding. Once a few were found, though, they often knew where others were located. Henny’s task was to memorize the name of each Jewish family member coming onboard as well as the address of the designated spot, and then slowly walk the group to a warehouse loft next to Gerda III under the cover of night. She remembered this being “absolutely stupid because there was a curfew on,” but despite the risk of arrest, Henny was able to safely guide four to five families to the warehouse each night depending on the number of members present. The families were given food and drinks in the loft and the children were given sedatives to keep them quiet. Silence there was vital.

At 6:00am the next morning the group began preparations to leave, and Gerda III was scheduled to depart for her usual routes one hour later. Two guards outside paced back and forth in a small area next to the boat, which sat about 5-7 meters from the warehouse. After a bit of discussion, the group decided to run across the road one by one while the guards’ backs were turned. The adults ran first followed by Henny and the crew, who carried the smaller children in their arms. Once onboard they were taken under deck and told to remain silent as Otto, John, Gerhardt, and Einar (the crew) concealed the hideaway with various items up top. A few minutes later the guards approached Gerda III to inspect it before departure and were given beer bottles to divert their attention. The plan worked and Henny along with her Jewish comrades began their two-hour journey to coastal Sweden.

This process continued for three weeks following their initial voyage, making daily adjustments to meeting places and times according to the size and capacity of the families. Henny later estimated that 600-700 Jewish individuals, as well as Polish refugees, members of various resistance groups, and injured British and American soldiers were taken to safety during the endeavor.

== Post-war and later life ==
After resisting Nazi orders via Gerda III, an unnamed resistance fighter came to Henny privately to ask if she would be willing to participate in other missions with them. She agreed and soon was given an assignment to determine the number of German soldiers patrolling specific areas while pretending to be in love with a young man in the group. However, when a planned attack went awry in February 1944, she became one of the few in her resistance group to escape from Zealand, Denmark to Helsingborg, Sweden. Several others were ordered to leave Denmark as well because the risk of disclosing pivotal information was too great. Henny later recalled feeling incredibly bored there. Despite being surrounded by soldiers, refugees, and a Danish brigade, none were allowed to leave unless resistance orders were given to do so.

It wasn't until May 1945 that the group heard a radio anchor declare Germany's final defeat and the official end to the war, which indicated the end of the resistance movement. Henny remembered feeling a bit disappointed (and seeing many colleagues express the same feeling) because they had spent a seemingly large amount of time waiting when they had hoped to be fighting. The return to Denmark was equally as conflicting. While they were praised and congratulated upon entering the crowded, flag-filled streets, they wished they had been able to do more.

Almost 50 years after this experience, an interview with Henny captured one of her reflections of post-war life. "It was as if after the war we had to forget all, everything about it. We never talked about it. You never asked questions. You never tried to find the people who helped you . . . You never really had the opportunity to thank those who had helped you. Everybody was busy getting on in life, so you simply stopped talking about war."

Despite her actions to rescue Jewish families during the 1940's and the impact it had on the war effort, little else is known about Henny Sinding's life until her death on August 22, 2008 in Allerød, Denmark.

== Impact in the media ==
Henny's story is preserved in various outlets on the internet, including:

- Blog post, “Special Mission for a Lighthouse Tender” by Marilyn Turk
- Website article, “The Museum of Jewish Heritage and Teaneck’s Jan Meyer Underscore Danes’ Courage Despite Consequences, and an Extraordinary Rescue" by Rachel S. Kovacs, Museum of Jewish Heritage, New York
- Website article, “The 22-Year-Old Woman Behind the Rescue of Over 300 Danish Jews” by Noa Gutow-Ellis and Howard Veisz, Museum of Jewish Heritage — A Living Memorial to the Holocaust, New York

== Additional resources ==
- Book, Harboring Hope: The True Story of How Henny Sinding Helped Denmark’s Jews Escape the Nazis by Susan Hood
- Book, Courage and Defiance: Stories of Spies, Saboteurs, and Survivors in WWII Denmark by Deborah Hopkinson
- Journal article, “Danish and Swedish Lightships Serving to Guarantee the Safety of the Danish Straits Area Sea Routes 1820–1988” by Antoni F. Komorowski and Iwona Pietkiewicz
- Online article, “German Occupation (1940-1945),” The National Museum of Denmark
- Online article, “Denmark," The United States Holocaust Memorial Museum
- Museum webpage, “Gerda III: Danish Lighthouse Tender,” Mystic Seaport Museum, New York
- Online memorial, "Danish Citizens who Saved Jews in Denmark," Eric Saul and the Institute for the Study of Rescue and Altruism in the Holocaust
- Online government record, “The Minister in Denmark (Atherton) to the Secretary of State,” United States of America Federal Government, Department of State, Office of the Historian
- Family group record, Paul Edvard Bartholin Sinding and Elna Addy Claudi-Magnussen, FamilySearch
