= Elsinore Sewing Club =

Danish Resistance group that saved Jews

The Elsinore Sewing Club (Danish: Helsingør Syklub), was a Danish organization established in 1943 which covertly transported Danish Jews to safety during the Nazi occupation of Denmark. The town of Helsingør (known as Elsinore in English) was only two miles away from Sweden, across the Øresund, from the Swedish city of Helsingborg. This allowed the transport of refugees by local boats.

The group, under an innocuous code name, formed amongst friends in Elsinore. The members combined their skills and resources to find vacant housing, fishing boats, and rationed gasoline to help Jewish refugees from across Denmark. They primarily used small fishing boats, with occasional successes in using a mining ferry, a stolen larger boat, and a speedboat the club purchased with donations.

After the flow of Jewish refugees stopped, the club remained active ferrying resistance members and downed Allied pilots to Sweden. The club was forced to dissolve when it was betrayed by informers, and leader Erling Kiær was sent to a concentration camp in Germany.

The members of the club all survived the war, and revenge was taken against the informers. One informer was then throttled and dumped overboard during a boat trip to Sweden, while the other was machine-gunned during dinner in his apartment.

== The Sewing Club ==
The Elsinore Sewing Club (known as Helsingør Syklub in Danish) was a codename given to an illegal underground Danish Resistance Movement group which formed during the occupation of Denmark in the Second World War in 1943. The club was an underground rescue operation, secretly transporting Danes from Helsingør (Elsinore: a town in Denmark) to safety across the Øresund; a strait which connects the Danish and Swedish borders; to the Swedish shores of Helsingborg. The name was used as an alias, and to deter the Nazis from discovering the rescue operation of the Danish-Jewish evacuation.

The group is especially renowned for the success rate of its operation, rescuing hundreds of Jews and bringing them to safety in Sweden after the Germans decided to deport Danish Jews to Nazi concentration camps. It is said that they transported around 700 Jews to safety. The Elsinore Sewing Club was one of the many successful Danish rescue operations and underground groups which took place during World War II. The Elsinore Sewing Club was amongst other underground groups which participated in the Jewish evacuation including Mogens Staffeldt's bookshop, The Rockefeller Institute, The Lyngby Group and the Danish Swedish Refugee Service. Unlike many other European countries, the Danes (people of Denmark) were a population who stood up for their Jewish population during World War II. Denmark had a 98.5 percent survival rate of Danish Jews by the end of World War II.

== Background: German Occupation of Denmark in World War II ==
Due to the devastation caused by World War I, Scandinavian countries of Denmark, Sweden and Norway decided to declare their neutrality when World War II begun. This meant that they did not want to take part in the conflict. In their plea to become neutral, the governments believed their citizens would be spared of the horrors surrounding the new World War, but they were wrong.

On 9 April 1940, German forces crossed the border into the neutral country Denmark, sparking the commencement of the German occupation of Denmark. This violated the previously agreed non-aggression treaty between Germany and Denmark. As the Danes were not expecting this, they were poorly equipped and outnumbered by the many German troops who began disembarking troops at the docks in Copenhagen, Denmark’ capital. This began the emergence of Danish Resistance Movement, as citizens of the public and soldiers wanted to help fight back against the Germans in an attempt to save their country.

It was later discovered that the Danish government had previously been warned about the German attack, however these warnings had all been ignored. Hans Lunding, a Colonel from the Danish army's intelligent office confirmed that the Danish Intelligence knew the attack was to be issued on 8 or 9 April but the Danish government made no effort to stop it. Herluf Zahle, the Danish ambassador to Germany, also warned the Danish government of the attack, but this was also ignored.

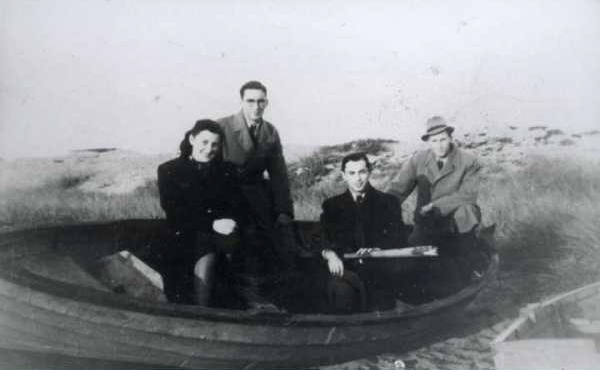
Danish Jews arriving in Sweden during World War II

As a result of the surprise attack to the Danish nation, the Danish government did not have time to declare the official war on Germany. As a result of this, sixteen Danish soldiers died in the initial invasion. After the first two hours, the Danish government surrendered as they believed there was little hope and would attempt to work out an agreement with Germany instead. In the first few years of the German occupation of Denmark, the Germans began to question the status of the Danish Jews. The Danes defended their Jewish citizens by shutting the Germans down, stating that there was no "Jewish question" in Denmark. There were also very few Danish resistance groups which had formed to combat the Germans in the first few years of the German occupation. The only resistance activities which had taken place were the production of underground newspapers. This caused Winston Churchill to label Denmark and its inhabitants as "Hitler’s Pet Canary". Subsequently, Danish Resistance movements began to form in higher numbers in 1941, following the invasion of the Soviet Union, also referred as Operation Barbarossa. The Elsinore Sewing Club was one of these resistance movements to form in an attempt to fight back against the Germans.

== Formation of The Elsinore Sewing Club ==
The Elsinore Sewing Club was formed by four Danish citizens and occupants of the town Elsinore in Denmark. The formation was aimed in helping the persecuted Jews across the Øresund straight. The members included bookbinder Erling Kiær, police officer Thormod Larsen, police clerk Ove Bruhn, and newspaper editor Børge Rønne. They addressed each other by their surnames – Kiær, Larsen, Bruhn and Rønne. The group expanded through its progression, however, these four were the founders and initial members of the group.

The group was given a variety of names in order to maintain its innocence and subtlety from the German Nazis. Such names included the Kiær-route, which highlighted the vital role played by Erling Kiær, but this neglected in crediting the other three members. Another name which was used to represent the group during its time was the Police-route, which attributed the high level of involvement by the Elsinore Police as well as the Coastal Police. It was agreed on to settle with the name, The Elsinore Sewing Club, or put more simply, the Sewing Club, to avoid any discrediting of vital members, whilst also maintaining the group's innocence.

== Erling Kiær ==
Erling Kiær was born on 16 February 1907, in Helsingør, Denmark. He was the son of August Kiær and Emmely Andrew. He was the founder and one of the most active members in the Elsinore Sewing Club resistance movement, and was one of the first Danish citizens to actively organise the transportation of Jews from Denmark to Sweden. He worked in agriculture after attending Sorø Academy School in Denmark, became a captain in the army whilst also training as a bookbinder. He was a citizen of Helsingør, and when the German occupation and persecution of the Danish Jews began in World War II, he was amongst the many citizens who were active in assisting to fight back. The escape route which the Elsinore Sewing Club created to rescue the Danish Jews to safety in Sweden was named the "Kiaer Line", after Erling Kiær, as he was the founder of the group. Kiær was a dedicated member of the rescue operation, he registered as a refugee in Sweden in 1943. Despite the work he was doing being illegal, he continued making regular trips from Helsingør to Sweden, carrying mail and refugees. On 12 May 1944, Erling Kiær's motorboat was found by German patrol boats, and he was arrested and taken to West Prison, and later, to a German concentration camp. He managed to survive, and he returned to Denmark. Erling Kiær was commended for his brave efforts in 1947 and was appointed Swedish consul in Helsingør. He received the Swedish Royal Order of Vasa of the first degree. He died on 22 October 1980.

== Location ==
=== The City of Elsinore (Helsingør), Denmark ===
Helsingør, known in English as Elsinore, is a city in North-Eastern Denmark. It lies opposite Helsingborg, Sweden at the narrowest part of The Sound (Øresund). It was the place where The Elsinore Sewing Club first formed, and where the four founders of the group inhabited.

=== The City of Helsingborg, Sweden ===
Helsingborg, formerly known as Hälsingborg, is a city and seaport located in Southern Sweden. It is situated at the narrowest part of The Sound (Øresund), and opposite the Danish town of Helsingør. This was the place where the Danish Jews were brought to be rescued.

=== The Øresund Bridge ===
The Øresund is a strait which connects the town of Elsinore (Helsingør) in Denmark, to Helsingborg in Sweden. The strait is now renowned because of the events which occurred in World War II when the Elsinore Sewing Club initiated the transportation of thousands of Danish Jews over this strait to safety by boats. Denmark and Sweden began the planning for a construction of a fixed link which would connect the two regions in March 1991. The bridge was later constructed and opened to the public in June 2000, and is now referred to as the Øresund Bridge.

== Danish Resistance Movement ==
The Danish Resistance Movement formed because many Danes, mainly soldiers and sailors, were unhappy with their government's cooperation in the fight against Germany in World War II. They took it amongst themselves and decided that if their leaders would not fight the operation, they would.

One of the most effective methods which the Danes used during the Holocaust in World War II was the formation of resistance and underground groups. The entire nation joined in order to help the Danish Jews who had been persecuted. Prior the German invasion on Denmark in 1943, the number of people involved in resistance movements were small, however this quickly changed. By October 1943, thousands of people joined the groups and thousands of others cooperated with them. By the time the war had ended, there were 56,000 members of the Danish Underground.

In the smuggling of the Jews, the Danish Resistance Movement, including the Elsinore Sewing Club, recruited fishermen and anyone willing to help transport Jews to the shores of Helsingborg in Sweden.

=== The Museum of Danish Resistance ===
The Museum of Danish Resistance documents the resistance movement during the German takeover of Denmark during World War II between 1940 and 1945. It contains many collections of objects, photos and records which document the resistance movement. It is located in Kastellet, Denmark, and is open to anyone who is interested in Denmark's history during World War II. The part of the National Museum of Denmark and is one of many museums located across Denmark which all recount different aspects of Danish history and all serve their own purpose. The National Museum of Denmark is the largest museum of cultural history, but other museums in the group include Kronborg Castle, Christiansborg Palace, Danish War Museum, and many more.

The Museum of Danish Resistance is closed due to a fire which occurred on 28 April 2013. The damage resulted in the building being demolished, however all artefacts and museum objects were saved. A new exhibition has been built in place of the old museum, however, has not yet opened, due to restrictions in place as a result of the COVID-19 pandemic.

== Tribute in The Holocaust Museum ==
Due to their efforts, the Holocaust Museum in Washington, DC has dedicated an exhibit to The Elsinore Sewing Club with a display of one of the three boats which the group used during the rescue operation. It is displayed as a symbol of light to contrast the dark chapter of mankind history which took place during the Holocaust in World War II. The exhibition is permanent and contains the fishing boat and a TV monitor with an informative display about the group. It is located on the second floor of the museum.

== See also ==
- Rescue of the Danish Jews
