= Albatros (1899) =

Sail training vessel

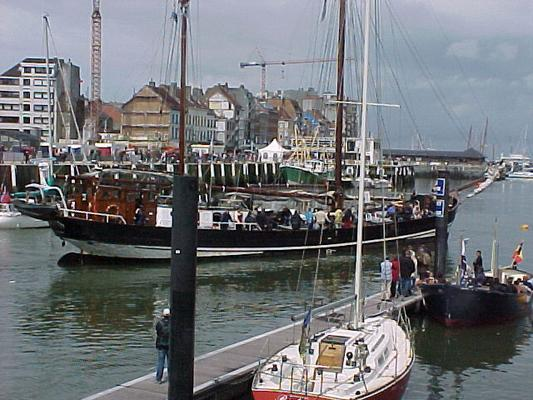

History

Netherlands
- Name: Albatros
- Builder: Kalkman, Capelle aan den IJssel
- Launched: 1899
- Home port: Amsterdam
- Identification: IMO number: 5008356, Callsign PFAB
- Status: Being refurbished

General characteristics
- Tonnage: 119 tonnes gross
- Displacement: 170 tonnes
- Length: 40 m (131 ft 3 in)
- Beam: 6.2 m (20 ft 4 in)
- Height: Air draught 28.75 m (94 ft 4 in)
- Draught: 1.9 m (6 ft 3 in)
- Propulsion: 415 m^{2} (4,470 sq ft) Sails, 160 hp (120 kW) Hundested 2 cylinder diesel engine
- Sail plan: Ketch
- Speed: 6 kn (11 km/h)
- Capacity: 15 passengers
- Crew: 4 crew
- Notes: Was the last commercial sailing ship in Europe.

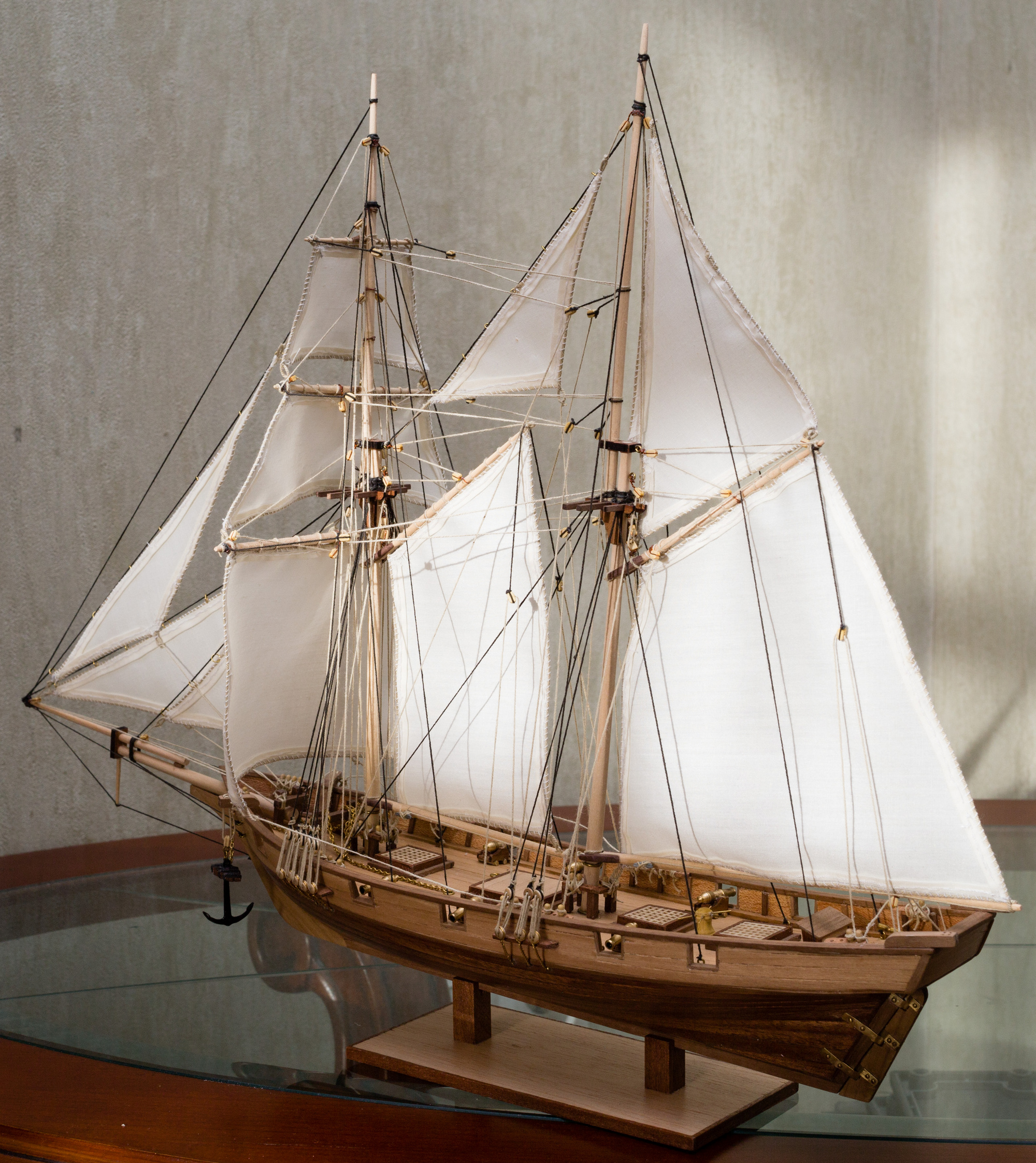
1:55 scale model

Albatros is a sailing ketch built in the Netherlands in 1899. Trading as a cargo sailing ship until 1996, she was used as a training vessel and then from 2005 a bar, restaurant, and bed & breakfast at the Wells-next-the-Sea quayside, before closing in 2019 and being sold and refurbished.

== List of owners ==
Time period	Owner
1899 – 1920	Johannes Muller
1920 – 1941	Cap. Lolk
1941 – 1980	Cap. Rasmussen
1980 – 2020	Antonius Brouwer
2020 - now	Bob Richardson

== History ==
=== 1899-1980 ===
Albatros was built at Capelle aan den IJssel in the Netherlands in 1899 as a Noordzee Klipper (North Sea cutter) or Galliot. Her first captain was Johannes Muller of Middelharnis, South Holland, who used her to transport cargo between the Netherlands and the Baltic states. In 1920, Albatros was sold to Captain Lolk from Svendborg, Denmark, who installed an 80 hp engine in 1933. In 1941, Lolk sold her to Captain Rasmussen from Hobro. During the Second World War, Albatros was used to smuggle Jews and political dissidents from Nazi-occupied Denmark to neutral Sweden. Weapons for the Danish resistance were also smuggled back into Denmark on the return journey.

Her rigging was reduced in 1964 and the rivetted steel below the waterline replaced with welded steel. A more powerful 160 hp engine replaced the old 80 hp engine. Rasmussen retired in 1978, and Albatros was laid up in Copenhagen.

=== Since 1980 ===
In 1980, Antonius "Ton" Brouwer bought Albatros, and made Amsterdam her new home port. She was restored under Germanischer Lloyd supervision between 1983 and 1987 and recommissioned as a sailing cargo ship. Her first cargo after restoration was soya beans to Macduff, Scotland.

Between 1987 and 1996, she could often be seen at Wells-next-the-Sea delivering her regular cargos of soya beans. With the closure of Wells as a commercial port in 1996, Albatros's career as a cargo ship was finally over. The final load of 100 tons of soya beans was delivered on 5 September 1996. At the time it was claimed that she was the last sailing ship carrying commercial cargo in Europe. During this time, her cargos also included corn, phosphates and timber. Apart from the regular run between Ghent and Wells, Albatros visited ports in the Channel Islands, Denmark, England, Estonia, Finland, Germany, Norway, Poland, Scotland and Sweden, sometimes making faster passages than motor driven ships.

Albatros was converted to a passenger ship in 1997-98. Between 1998 and 2000, she was chartered and rebuilt by Greenpeace and used as a sailing classroom in an environmental education program. In 2001, she returned to Wells, and The Albatros Project was created to support her upkeep. The ship established a programme of passenger and training voyages as well as private charters and events at Wells. While on the Thames Estuary on 22 August 2004, a passenger on board Albatros died when he fell from the rigging. An investigation was carried out by the Marine Accident Investigation Branch, which found shortcomings in the regulatory requirements for foreign passenger vessels operating in the UK, as well as in the safety management regime and manning of Albatros.

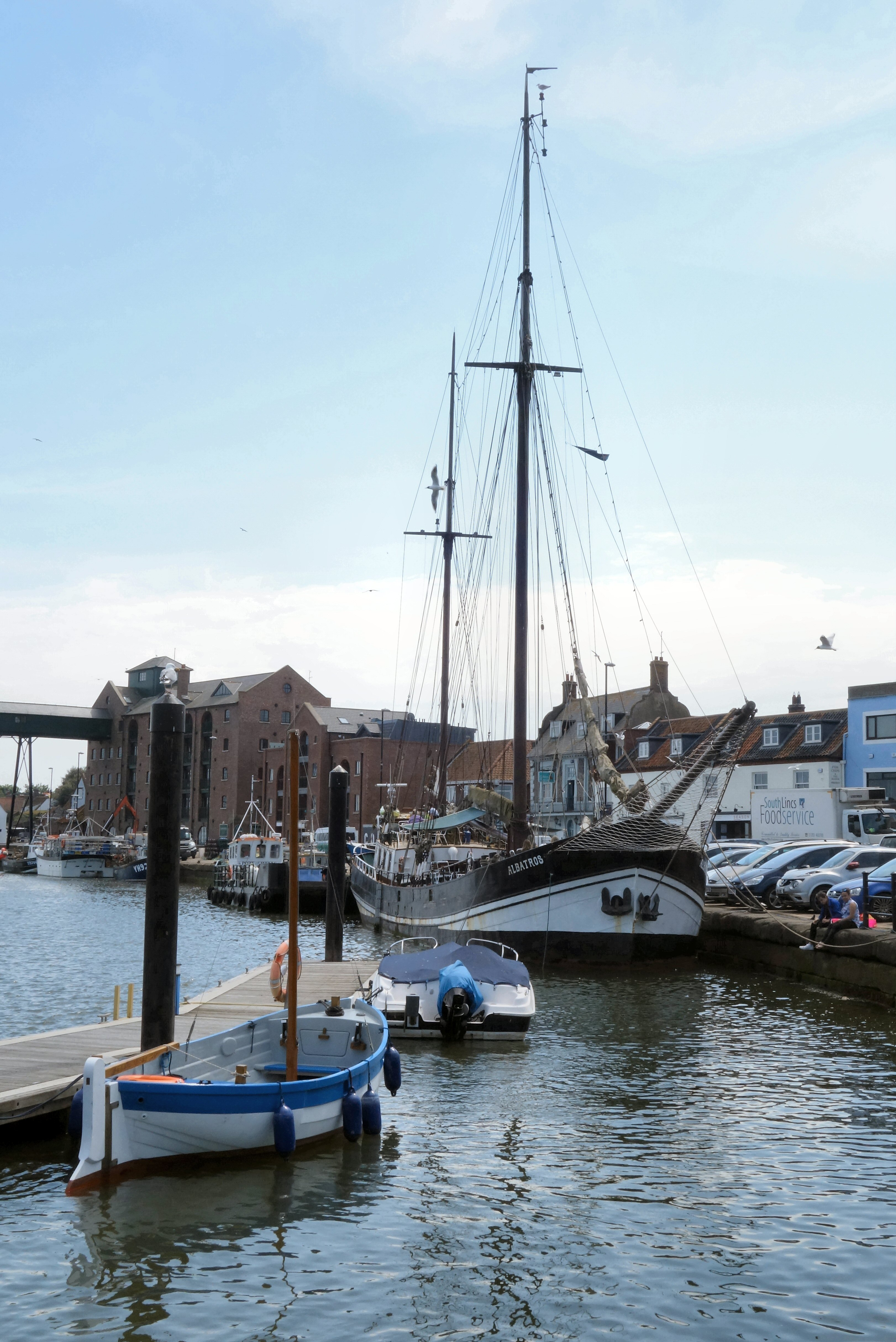
At the Wells-next-the-Sea quay in 2018

From 2005, sailing trips were gradually replaced by the development of the ship as a bar, restaurant, music venue and bed and breakfast at her Wells berth. Ton Brouwer sold the ship in 2020 and in November 2023 self-published a book, "My Life on the Albatros". The new owner, Bob Richardson, has been refurbishing the ship since 2020 and plans to reopen it as a bed and breakfast. It spent three years in Essex under renovation before returning to Wells-next-the-sea in July 2023.
