= Rescue of the Danish Jews =

Event during World War II

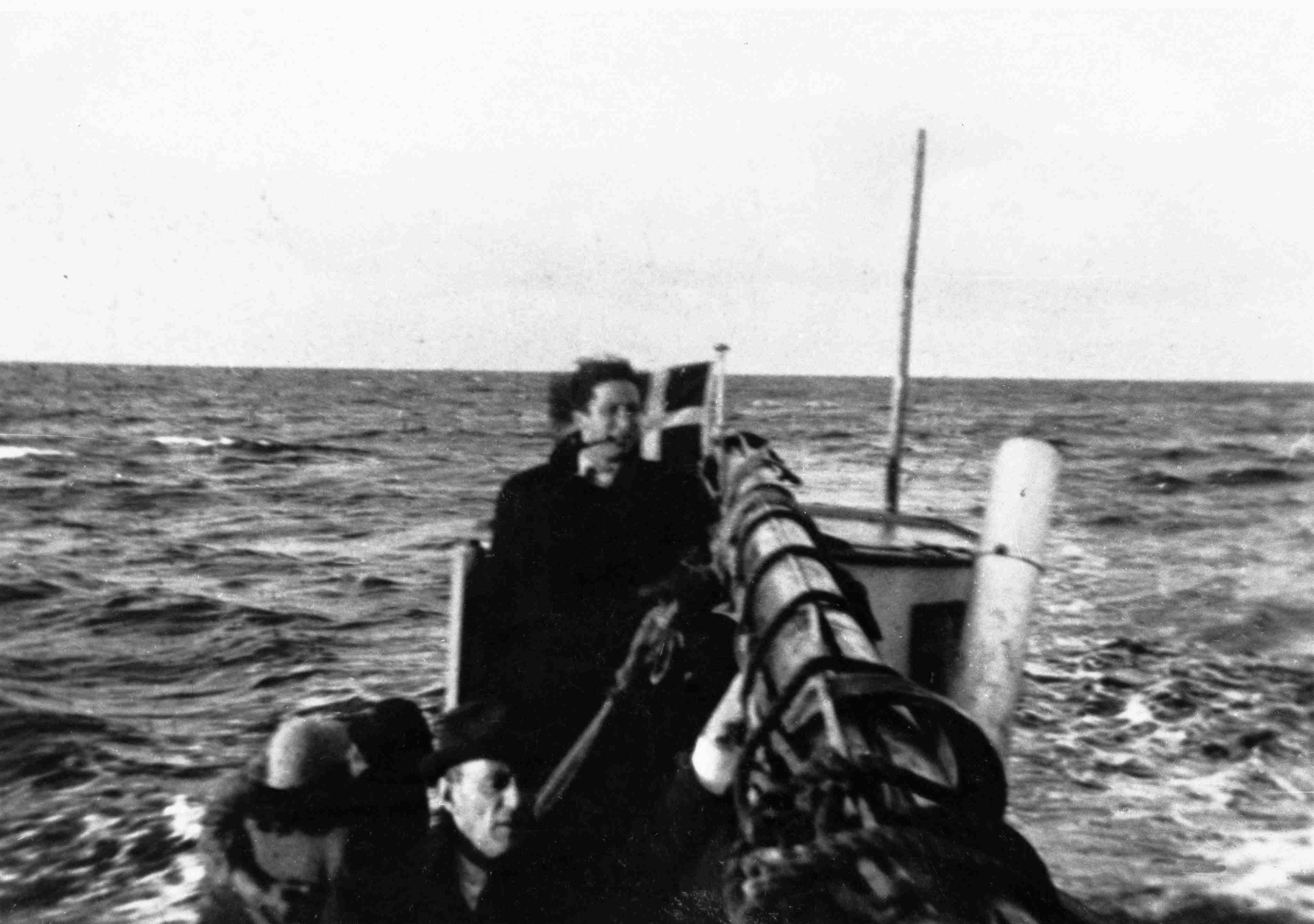
Danish Jews being transported to Sweden

The Danish resistance movement, with the assistance of many Danish citizens, managed to evacuate 7,500 of Denmark's 8,000 Jews, plus 686 non-Jewish spouses, by sea to nearby neutral Sweden during the Second World War. Many efforts to save the Danish Jews from harm began before the German leader Adolf Hitler officially ordered their arrest and deportation; on September 28, 1943, German diplomat Georg Ferdinand Duckwitz leaked Hitler's plans to do so to the Danish government.

This rescue is considered one of the largest actions of collective resistance to aggression in the countries occupied by Nazi Germany during the Second World War. As a result of the rescue, and of the following Danish intercession on behalf of the 464 Danish Jews who were captured and deported to the Theresienstadt concentration camp in the Protectorate of Bohemia and Moravia, 99% of Denmark's Jewish population survived the Holocaust.

== Deportation order ==
The German occupiers began their plans for the deportation to Nazi concentration camps of the 8,000 Danish Jews after it became apparent that the Nazis could not expect the Danish government to support this. German diplomat Georg Ferdinand Duckwitz made his vain attempt to assure safe harbor for the Danish Jews in Sweden; the government told Duckwitz it would accept the Danish Jews only if approved by the Nazis, who let the request for approval go ignored.

On September 28, 1943, Duckwitz leaked word of the plans for the operation against Denmark's Jews to Hans Hedtoft, chairman of the Danish Social Democratic Party. Hedtoft contacted the Danish Resistance Movement and the head of the Jewish community, C. B. Henriques, who in turn alerted the acting chief rabbi, Marcus Melchior. At the early morning services, on September 29, the day prior to the Rosh Hashanah services, the Jews were warned of the Nazis' planned action. They were urged to go into hiding immediately and spread the word to all their friends and relatives. The German action to deport the Jews prompted the Danish state church and all political parties except the pro-Nazi National Socialist Workers' Party of Denmark (NSWPD) immediately to denounce the action and to pledge solidarity with their fellow Jewish citizens. For the first time they openly opposed the occupation. At once, the Danish bishops issued a hyrdebrev—a pastoral letter to all citizens. The letter was distributed to all Danish ministers, to be read out in every church on the following Sunday.

The early phases of the rescue were improvised. When Danish civil servants at several levels in different ministries learned of the German plan to round up all of the country's Jews, they independently pursued various measures to find and hide the Jews. Some simply contacted their friends, asking them to go through telephone books and warn those with Jewish-sounding names to go into hiding. Most Jews hid for several days or weeks, uncertain of their fate.

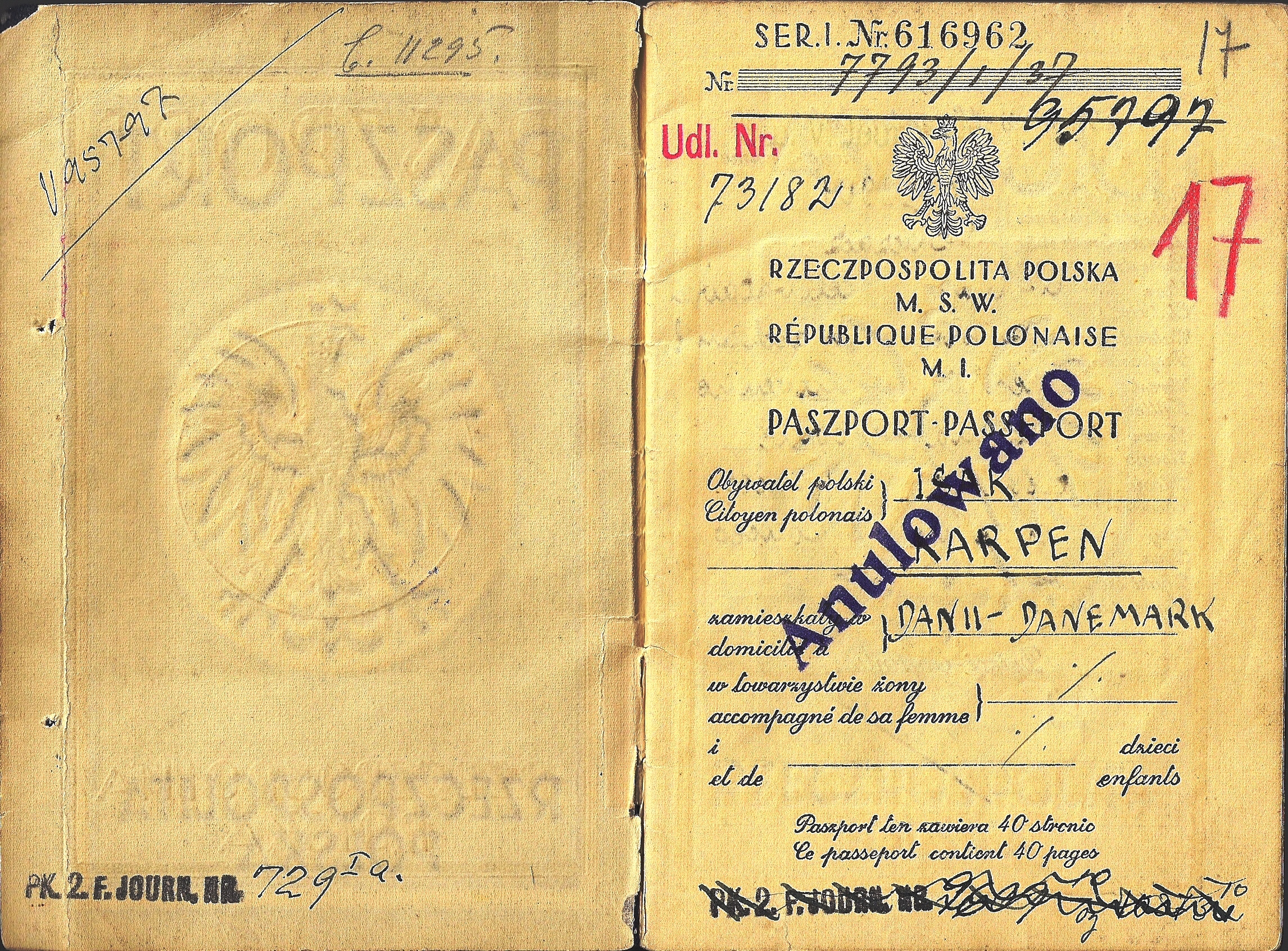
Prewar Polish passport used to register in Sweden in 1943 after being smuggled away from occupied Denmark.

== Sweden's readiness and logistics ==
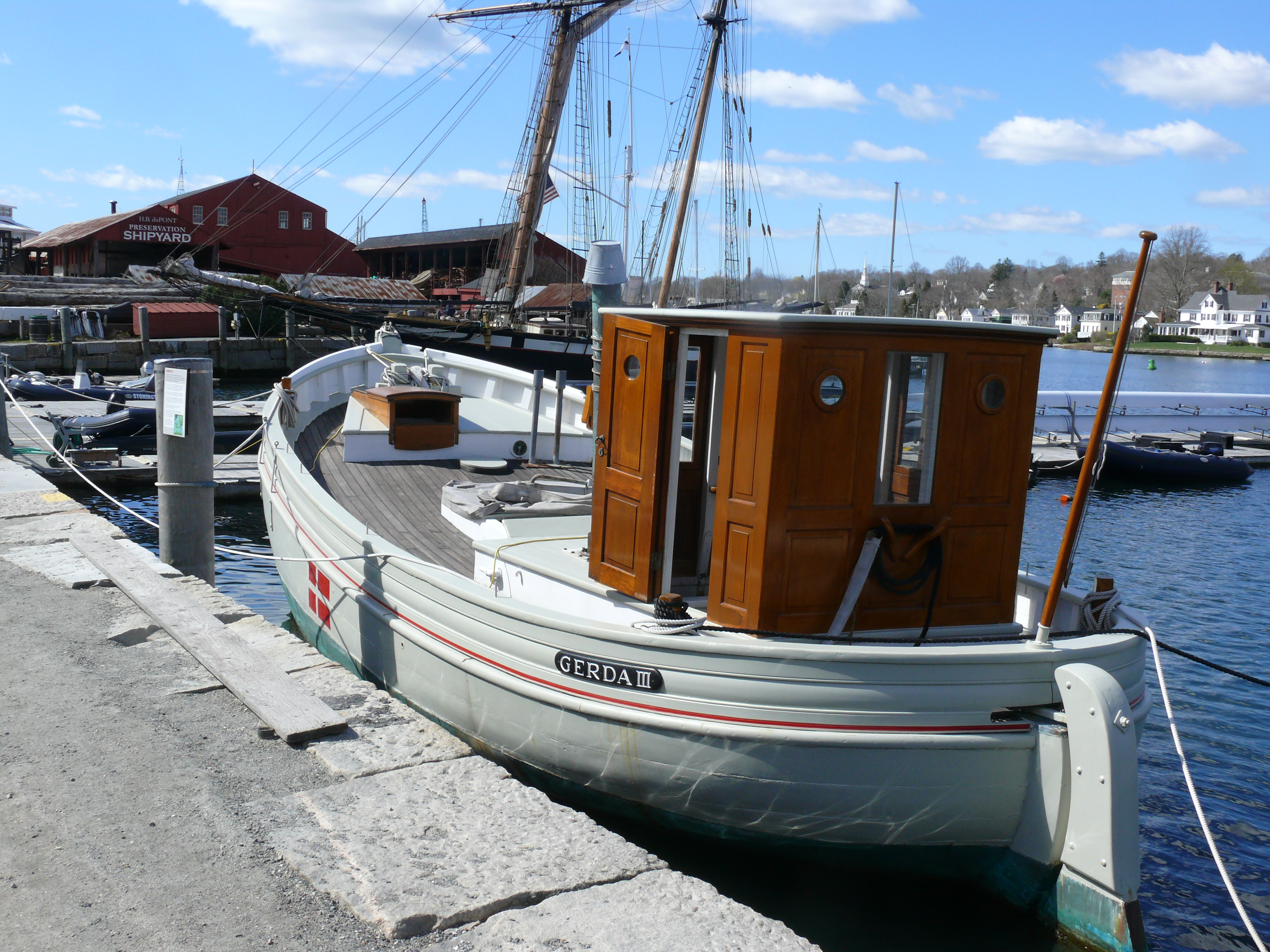
From October 1943 the boat Gerda III of the Danish Lighthouse and Buoy Service was used to ferry Jewish refugees from German-occupied Denmark to neutral Sweden. With a group of some ten refugees on board for each trip, the vessel set out for her official lighthouse duties before detouring to the coast of Sweden. Between the lighthouse manager's daughter Henny Sinding Sundø and Gerda III's crew (Skipper Otto Andersen, John Hansen, Gerhardt Steffensen, and Einar Tønnesen), they together ferried approximately 300 Jews to safety.

Although most Danish Jews were in hiding, most would likely have been caught eventually if safe passage to Sweden had not been secured. Sweden had earlier been receiving Norwegian Jews with some sort of connection. But the actions to save the Norwegians were not entirely effective due to the lack of experience dealing with the German occupation authorities. When martial law was introduced in Denmark on August 29, the Swedish Ministry for Foreign Affairs (UD) realized that the Danish Jews were in immediate danger. In a letter dated August 31, the Swedish ambassador in Copenhagen was given clearance by the Chief Legal Officer Gösta Engzell (who had represented Sweden at the 1938 Évian Conference, held to discuss Jewish refugees fleeing the Nazi regime) to issue Swedish passports to "rescue Danish Jews and bring them here." On October 2, the Swedish government announced in an official statement that Sweden was prepared to accept all Danish Jews. It was a message parallel to an earlier unofficial statement made to the German occupation authorities in Norway.

The Jews were smuggled and transported over the Øresund strait from Zealand to Sweden — a passage of varying time depending on the specific route and the weather; but averaging under an hour on the choppy winter sea. Some were transported in large fishing boats of up to 20 tons; others were carried to freedom in rowboats or kayaks. The ketch Albatros and the lighthouse tender Gerda III were two of the ships used to smuggle Jews to Sweden. Some refugees were smuggled inside freight rail cars on the regular ferries between the two countries, this route being suited for the very young or old who were too weak to endure a rough sea passage. Operatives had broken into empty freight cars sealed by the Nazis after inspection, helped refugees onto the cars, and then resealed them with forged or stolen seals to forestall further inspection.

The fishermen charged on average 1,000 Danish kroner per person for the transport, but some charged up to 50,000 kroner. The average monthly wage at the time was less than 500 kroner; half of the rescued Jews belonged to the working class. Prices were determined by the market principles of supply and demand, as well as by the fishermen's perception of the risk. The Danish Resistance Movement took an active role in organizing the rescue and providing financing, mostly from wealthy Danes who donated large sums of money to the endeavor. In all, the rescue is estimated to have cost around 20 million kroner, about half of which were paid by Jewish families, as well as half from donations and collections.

=== 2 October Swedish radio broadcast ===
The Danish physicist Niels Bohr, whose mother was Jewish, made a determined stand for his fellow countrymen in a personal appeal to the Swedish king and government ministers. King Gustaf V granted him an audience after a persuasive call from Greta Garbo, who knew Bohr. He was spirited off to Sweden together with his wife on 29 September. When Bohr arrived, Swedish government representatives told him he had to board an aircraft immediately for the United States (to work on the top-secret Manhattan Project). Bohr refused. He told the officials — and eventually the king — that until Sweden announced over its airwaves and through its press that its borders would be open to receive the Danish Jews, he was not going anywhere. Bohr wrote of these events in his memoirs. As related by the historian Richard Rhodes, on 30 September Bohr persuaded Gustaf to make public Sweden's willingness to provide asylum, and on 2 October Swedish radio broadcast that Sweden was ready to receive the Jewish refugees. Rhodes and other historians interpret Bohr's actions in Sweden as being a necessary precursor without which mass rescue could not have occurred. According to Paul A. Levine, however — who does not mention the Bohr factor at all — the Swedish Ministry for Foreign Affairs acted on clear instructions given much earlier by Prime Minister Per Albin Hansson and Foreign Minister Christian Günther, following a policy already established in 1942.

== Rescues ==
During the first days of the rescue action, Jews moved into the many fishing harbors on the Danish coast to await passage, but officers of the Gestapo became suspicious of activity around harbors (and on the night of October 6, about 80 Jews were caught hiding in the loft of the church at Gilleleje, their hiding place having been betrayed by a Danish girl who was in love with a German soldier). Subsequent rescues had to take place from isolated points along the coast. While waiting their turn, the Jews took refuge in the woods and in cottages away from the coast, out of sight of the Gestapo.

Danish harbor police and civil police often cooperated with the rescue effort. During the early stages, the Gestapo was undermanned and the German army and navy were called in to reinforce the Gestapo in its effort to prevent transportation taking place. The local Germans in command, for their own political calculations and through their own inactivity, may have actually facilitated the escape.

=== Partial list of Danish rescuers and resisters ===
While only a few Danes, mostly non-resistance members who happened to be known by the Jew they helped, made the Yad Vashem list, there were several hundreds, if not a few thousands, of ordinary Danes who took part in the rescue efforts. They most often worked within small spontaneously organized groups and "under cover". Known only by their fictitious names, they could generally not be identified by those who were helped and thus did not meet the Yad Vashem criteria for the "Righteous Among the Nations" honor. Below is a partial list of some of the more significant rescuers, both within and outside the formal resistance movement, whose names have surfaced over the years:

- Fanny Arnskov of the Danish chapter of the Women's International League for Peace and Freedom
- Aage and Gerda Bertelsen, rescuers, Gerda was a leader of the Lyngby Group
- Ellen Christensen, resistance fighter, rescuer, nurse
- Knud Dyby
- Richard and Vibeke Ege
- Elsinore Sewing Club (Danish: Helsingør Syklub) sprang up to covertly ferry Jews to safety
- Jørgen Gersfelt
- Gunnar Gregersen
- Hilbert Hansen
- Steffen Hansen
- Jørgen Jenk
- Ole Lippmann
- Ejler Haubirk
- Ole Helwig
- Leif B. Hendil, who established the Danish-Swedish Refugee Service
- Erik Husfeldt, leader in Frode Jakobsen's Ring, member of the Danish Freedom Council
- Jørgen Hviid, who helped smuggle many Jewish Families via hollowed-out secret compartments in trucks in his trucking company
- Signe (Mogensen) Jansen
- Robert Jensen
- Erling Kiær
- Elsebeth Kieler
- Jørgen Kieler
- Karl Henrik Køster
- Gurli Larsen
- Thormod Larsen
- Jens Lillelund of the Holger Danske resistance group
- Ebba Lund
- Steffen Lund
- Ellen W. Nielsen
- Svend Otto Nielsen ("John")
- Robert Petersen
- Henry Rasmussen
- Paul Kristian Brandt Rehberg
- Børge Rønne
- Find Sandgren
- Ole Secher
- Svenn Seehusen
- Laust Sørensen
- Erik Stærmose
- Mogens Staffeldt
- Henny Sinding Sundø
- Henry Thomsen

=== "Righteous among the nations" ===
At their initial insistence, the Danish resistance movement wished to be honored only as a collective effort by Yad Vashem in Israel as being part of the "Righteous Among the Nations"; only a handful are individually named for that honor. Instead, the rescue of the Jews of Denmark is represented at Yad Vashem by a tree planting to the King and the Danish Resistance movement—and by an authentic fishing boat from the Danish village of Gilleleje. Similarly, the US Holocaust Museum in Washington, D.C., has on permanent exhibit an authentic rescue boat used in several crossings in the rescue of some 1,400 Jews.

Georg Ferdinand Duckwitz, the German official who leaked word of the round-up, is also on the Yad Vashem list.

== Arrests and deportation to Theresienstadt ==
In Copenhagen, the deportation order was carried out on the Jewish New Year, the night of October 1–2, when the Germans assumed all Jews would be gathered at home. The roundup was organized by the SS who used two police battalions and about 50 Danish volunteer members of the Waffen SS chosen for their familiarity with Copenhagen and northern Zealand. The SS organized themselves in five-man teams, each with a Dane, a vehicle, and a list of addresses to check. Most teams found no one, but one team found four Jews on the fifth address checked. A bribe of 15,000 kroner was rejected, and the cash was destroyed.

Of 580 Danish Jews who failed to escape to Sweden, 464 were arrested.

They were allowed to bring two blankets, food for three or four days, and a small suitcase. They were transported to the harbour, Langelinie, where a couple of large ships awaited them. One of the Danish Waffen-SS members believed the Jews were being sent to Danzig.

The Danish Jews were sent ultimately to the Theresienstadt concentration camp in German-occupied Czechoslovakia. After these Jews' deportation, leading Danish civil servants persuaded the Germans to accept packages of food and medicine for the prisoners; furthermore, Denmark persuaded the Germans not to deport the Danish Jews to extermination camps. This was achieved by Danish political pressure, using the Danish Red Cross to frequently monitor the condition of the Danish Jews at Theresienstadt. A total of 51 Danish Jews—mostly elderly—died of disease at Theresienstadt.

=== Rescue by Folke Bernadotte ===
In April 1945, as the war drew to a close, 425 surviving Danish Jews (a few having been born in the camp) were among the several thousand Jews rescued by an operation led by Folke Bernadotte of the Swedish Red Cross who organized the transporting of interned Norwegians, Danes and western European inmates from German concentration camps to hospitals in Sweden. Around 15,000 people were taken to safety in the White Buses of the Bernadotte expedition.

== Aftermath ==
About 116 Danish Jews remained hidden in Denmark until the war's end, a few died of accidents or committed suicide, and a handful had special permission to stay.

The casualties among Danish Jews during the Holocaust were among the lowest of the occupied countries of Europe. Yad Vashem records only 102 Jews from Denmark who were murdered in the Shoah.

The unsuccessful German deportation attempt and the actions to save the Jews were important steps in linking the resistance movement to broader anti-Nazi sentiments in Denmark. In many ways, October 1943 and the rescuing of the Jews marked a change in most people's perception of the war and the occupation, thereby giving a "subjective-psychological" foundation for the legend.

A few days after the roundup, a small news item in the New York Daily News reported that the Danish king, Christian X, had told the German authorities that if the Danish Jews would be forced to wear a yellow Star of David, he and the whole Danish people would do so as well. Later, the story was mentioned in Leon Uris's novel Exodus and in its movie adaptation. Political theorist Hannah Arendt also mentions it during the discussion of Denmark in her book of reportage, Eichmann in Jerusalem.

== Explanations ==
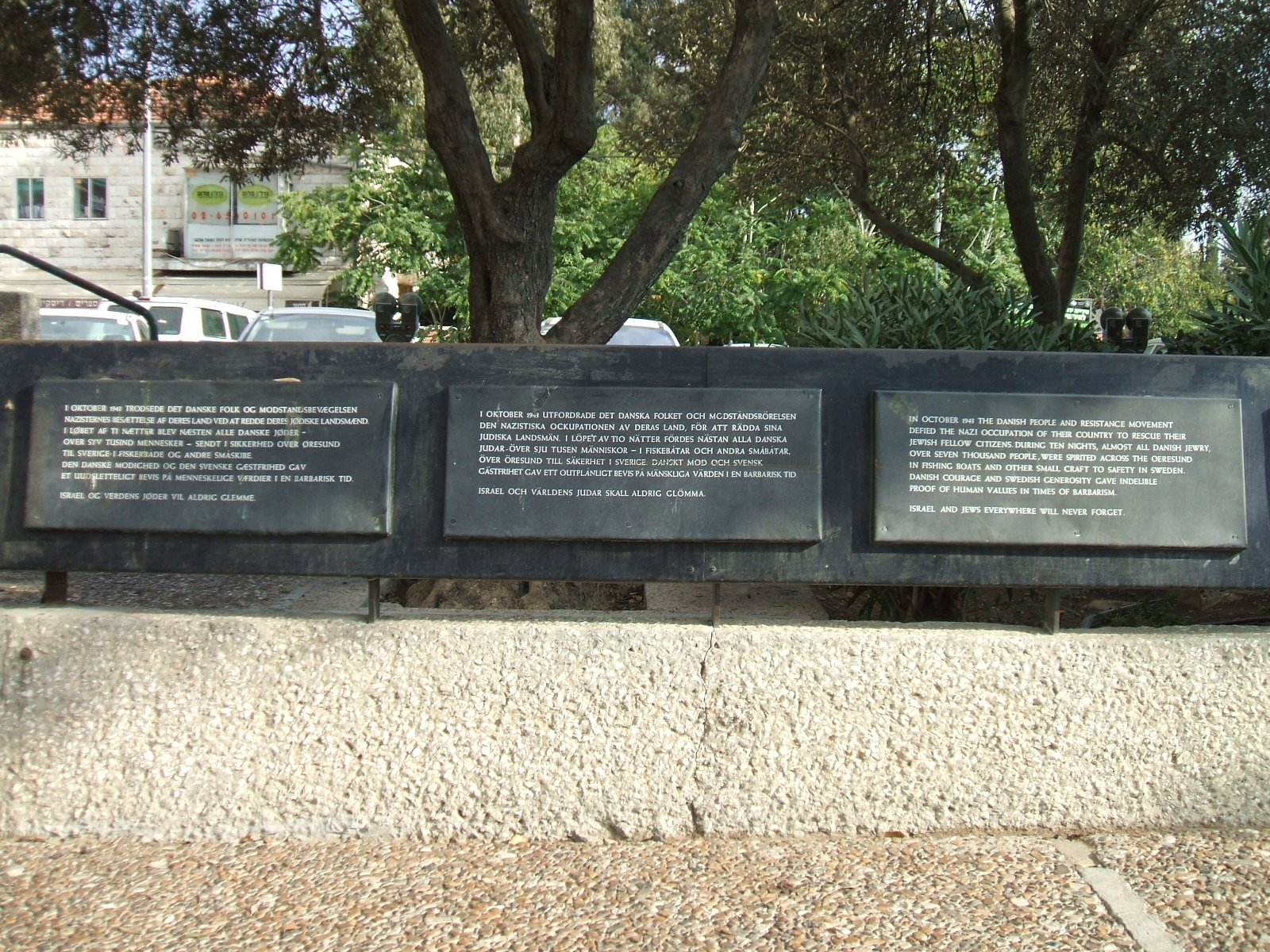
Memorial in "Denmark Square", Jerusalem

Different explanations have been advanced to explain the success of efforts to protect the Danish Jewish population in the light of less success at similar operations elsewhere in Nazi-occupied Europe:

- The German Reich plenipotentiary of Denmark, Werner Best, despite instigating the roundup via a telegram he sent to Hitler on September 8, 1943, did not act to enforce it. He was aware of the efforts by Duckwitz to have the roundup cancelled, and knew about the potential escape of the Jews to Sweden, but he turned a blind eye to it, as did the Wehrmacht (which was guarding the Danish coast), in order to preserve Germany's relationship with Denmark. According to the account of a survivor, Best himself had warned the survivor to escape.

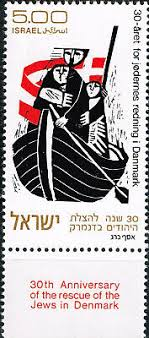
1973 Israel stamp commemorating the rescue

- Logistically, the operation was relatively simple. Denmark's Jewish population was small, both in relative and absolute terms, and most of Denmark's Jews lived in or near Copenhagen, only a short sea voyage from neutral Sweden (typically 5 to 10 kilometres (3 to 6 mi)). Although hazardous, the boat ride was easier to conceal than a comparable land journey.
- Since the mid-19th century, a particular brand of romantic nationalism had evolved in Denmark. The traits of this nationalism included emphasis on the importance of "smallness", close-knit communities, and traditions—this nationalism being largely a response to Denmark's failure to assert itself as a great power and its losses in the Gunboat War and the Second War of Schleswig. Some historians, such as Leni Yahil (The Rescue of Danish Jewry: Test of a Democracy, 1969), believe that the Danish form of non-aggressive nationalism, influenced by Danish spiritual leader N. F. S. Grundtvig, encouraged the Danes to identify with the plight of the Jews, even though small-scale anti-Semitism had been present in Denmark long before the German invasion.
- Denmark's Jewish population had long been thoroughly integrated into Danish society, and some members of the small Jewish community had risen to prominence. Consequently, most Danes perceived the Nazis' action against Denmark's Jews as an affront to all Danes, and rallied to the protection of their country's citizens.. The personal initiative and agency of most Danish Jews was also a contributing factor in the success of the operation.
- The deportation of Jews in Denmark came one year after the deportations of Jews in Norway. That created an outrage in all of Scandinavia, alerted the Danish Jews, and pushed the Swedish government to declare that it would receive all Jews who managed to escape the Nazis.
- The German demand to deport the Danish Jews came after the battle of Stalingrad when it became clear that the Nazis were losing the war. That was a contributing factor in Sweden's willingness to allow the Jews into Sweden.

== In popular culture ==
Films

- The Only Way 1970 film about the escape of Danish Jews to Sweden during World War II
- A Day in October 1991 film about the escape of Danish Jews to Sweden during World War II
- Miracle at Midnight 1998 American TV movie about the escape of Danish Jews to Sweden during World War II
- The Danish Solution: The Rescue of the Jews in Denmark 2003 documentary about the escape of Danish Jews to Sweden during World War II
- Across the Waters, 2016 film based on the true story of Niels Børge Lund Ferdinandsen, who rescued the Danish Jews during World War II
- The Swedish Connection explores these events from the perspective of Gösta Engzell and his team in the Legal Department of the Ministry for Foreign Affairs.

Books

- A Night of Watching (1967) a work of historical fiction by Elliot Arnold about the escape of Danish Jews to Sweden during World War II.
- Number the Stars (1989) a work of historical fiction by Lois Lowry about the escape of Danish Jews to Sweden during World War II.
- Harboring Hope: The True Story of How Henny Sinding Helped Denmark’s Jews Escape the Nazis (2023) a work of historical fiction by Susan Hood (Harper Collins).

== Remnants ==
Since 2025 one of the boats of the flotilla that rescued the Danish Jews has been on display in the Florida Holocaust Museum in St Petersburg. The museum located this boat in Denmark, where it was still used and belonged to the same family as in 1943.

== See also ==
- Denmark in World War II
- Rescue of the Bulgarian Jews
- History of Jews
- Nazi war crimes
- Hedvig Delbo, Gestapo agent
