= Miracle at Midnight =

American TV movie

- Written by: Chris Bryant; Monte Merrick
- Directed by: Ken Cameron
- Music by: William Goldstein
- Countries of origin: United States; Ireland
- Original language: English

Production
- Producers: Samuel Benedict; John Davis; Donna Ebbs; Randi Johnson; Merrill H. Karpf; Morgan O'Sullivan; Stephanie Waxman
- Cinematography: Kenneth MacMillan
- Editor: Susan B. Browdy
- Running time: 90 minutes

Original release
- Network: ABC
- Release: May 17, 1998

Miracle at Midnight is an American TV movie based on the rescue of the Danish Jews in Denmark during the Holocaust. It is a Disney production and premiered on ABC on May 17, 1998.

== Plot ==
Set in Denmark during September 27 – October 3, 1943, Miracle at Midnight is a dramatization of the true story of the Danish rescue of Jews from deportation to Nazi concentration camps. Doctor Karl and Doris Koster are a Christian couple living in Copenhagen with their children, 18-year-old Henrik and preteen Else.

As Chief Surgeon of Christiana Hospital, Doctor Karl Koster initially uses his position to protect a young resistance fighter shot by the Nazis. Meanwhile, Henrik is secretly working for the same group, commandeering weapons sent to the Nazis.

On Wednesday, September 29, 1943 (three years into the occupation), Doctor Koster learns of the imminent arrest of the Danish Jews on midnight Friday (the beginning of Rosh Hashanah) from a former government minister, who had been alerted by German maritime attache Georg Duckwitz. The Kosters start by hiding Rabbi Ben Abrams and his family but soon realize they can become an integral part of an effort to transport over 7,000 Jews to neutral Sweden.

Doctor Koster, his family, the hospital staff, and the majority of residents work with the resistance to save the Danish Jews from deportation to the Theresienstadt concentration camp, from hiding them in their homes to admitting them as patients under Christian names to hiding them in the morgue.

Henrik and his friend load up a truckload of Jews, planning to drive them to the coast, where they'll be taken to safety in Sweden. En route, they are stopped by German Nazi officials who tell Henrik to open the back of the truck. When the Nazis find Jews, Henrik's friend runs and gets help from Dr. Koster, who springs Henrik, but Henrik's friend is killed while distracting the Germans.

First they find hiding places for the Jews to survive the initial raids, and then they work with the Swedish government and local fishermen to transport them to safety. Meanwhile, Henrik secures transport to get people to the coast. They discover that one of the fishermen that was helping them transport Jews is a traitor and tried to turn them in to the Germans. This results in them almost getting caught by the descending SS, but the resistance fighters show up and provide cover for the remaining boat to get away.

Finally, the Kosters themselves flee when the Nazis discover their activity. Doris Koster is captured by the Nazis, but the rest escape to Sweden. Doris is questioned by the Nazis and released two years later, and the family reunited offscreen.

== Cast ==
- Sam Waterston as Dr. Karl Koster
- Mia Farrow as Doris Koster
- Justin Whalin as Henrik Koster
- Patrick Malahide as Georg Duckwitz
- Andrew Scott as Michael Grunbaum
- Halina Froudist as Ruth Abrams
- Daisy Beaumont as Hannah Abrams
- Eva Birthistle as Karin

== Production notes ==
The film opens with a map of Nazi-occupied Europe in 1943. The map includes numerous errors. Austria is not displayed as an incorporated part of Germany. Yugoslavia shows its current division into independent republics. East Prussia is not shown; the Kaliningrad enclave appears instead.

== Notes ==
- First aired: Sunday, May 17
- As part of the Wonderful World of Disney Classroom Edition series, Miracle at Midnight has a website with a range of supporting educational materials.

== See also ==
- List of Holocaust films
- List of World War II films
