= Fanny Arnskov =

Danish woman who helped Jews escape deportation by Nazis in WWII

- Born: 17 April 1889
- Known for: Rescue and relief efforts in Denmark during the Holocaust

Fanny Arnskov (born 17 April 1889) was a Danish woman who helped Jews escape deportation by Nazis during World War II (1939–1945). She was a leader of the Women's League for Peace and Freedom.

== Women's International League for Peace and Freedom ==
Arnskov was a leader of the Danish chapter of the Women's International League for Peace and Freedom. She helped rescue Jews escape the Nazis. During World War II, she managed the League's office in Copenhagen. The organization collaborated with the Society of Jewish Women to send 300 children rescued from Nazi concentration camps to Denmark and Palestine. Arnskov coordinated with the National Board of Social Welfare and Legation Counselor Hellstedt's Director General Héjer to arrange for Sweden to accept 187 Jewish children. With the Holocaust, they had become stateless, were trained in agriculture, and were brought to Denmark. To avoid being collected by Nazis, Arnskov sought to obtain permits so that the children could find refuge in Sweden.

== Goldberger family ==
In September 1943, Nazi Germany planned to collect and deport Danish Jews on 1 and 2 October 1943, during Rosh Hashanah, the Jewish New Year. Word of the upcoming mass arrest was spread from a concerned German diplomat and then amongst the Danish Jews.

Leo Goldberger and his parents heard of the upcoming mass arrest while staying in a resort in Helsingør (Elsinore), Denmark. They did not have enough money to fund their escape, so Leo's father, Cantor Goldberger, took a train to Copenhagen to seek a means to cross the Baltic Sea to Sweden. During the train ride, he traveled in the same compartment as Fanny Arnskov, an acquaintance, who had noticed his distress. During their conversation, she learned of his mission. She agreed to help him, and once they arrived in Copenhagen, she asked Goldberger to meet her back at the same train station after several hours. She returned with the money and plans for the family's escape. A Lutheran pastor, Henry Rasmussen, provided 20,000 kroner (about $3,500 US dollars) to Arnskov, who arranged for a boat to take the Goldbergers to Sweden the following night. (Note: Rev. Henry Rasmussen, a parish priest and missionary, was associated with the Danish Israel Mission. After the war, when Cantor Goldberger attempted to repay the money, Rasmussen would not accept it.)

The Goldbergers, a family of five with three sons, were met on a beach in Dragør by a fishing boat with 20 other refugees. It took them several hours to reach Sweden, where they lived until the end of the war.

During World War II, Sweden changed their foreign policy to take in thousands of Danish refugees, including Danish resistance fighters and Jewish and Christian people. In Sweden, the refugees found employment and housing. They were allowed to establish schools with Danish books and curricula.

== Theresienstadt ==
During the Holocaust, Nazis collected and deported European Jews to extermination camps, where they were murdered or died of starvation. The Danish government maintained that Danish Jews should be allowed to receive parcels.

Arnskov organized relief efforts for Danish Jews at Theresienstadt. They sent clothing and food, like fruit, meats, and cheeses. To increase the likelihood that packages would reach the Jews at Theresienstadt, their packages were sent through the Red Cross.

Deportees sent letter cards to thank the League staff or foster families for the packages, like this note to Arnskov on 4 November 1943.

We four are together and are all well. Do write at once. Do tell your daughter she must write to use often. We will be very glad to hear from her. Have you a lot to do at the office? We think much of you. With many kind regards,

— Yours Melanie Oppenhejm.

== See also ==
- Rescue of the Danish Jews § Deportation order and rescue
