= Gerda III =

Coordinates: 41°21′45″N 71°57′55″W

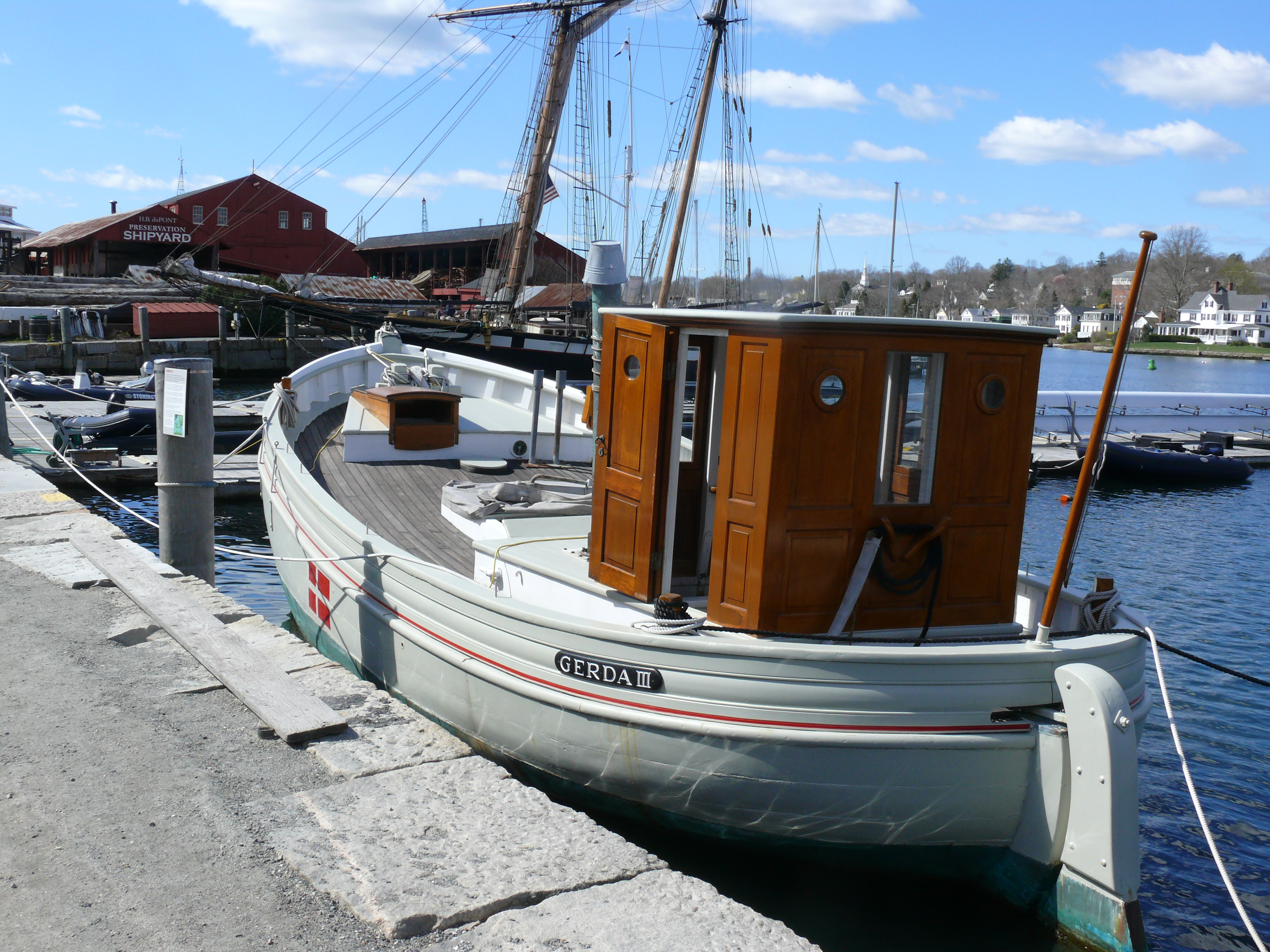
- Gerda III

History

United States
- Owner: Mystic Seaport
- Completed: 1928
- Status: Museum ship

Gerda III is a lighthouse tender located at Mystic Seaport in Mystic, Connecticut, United States. Gerda III was built in 1928 in Denmark and was used as a common work boat. In 1943 Gerda III was used by 22-year old Henny Sinding Sundo to smuggle Jews from Nazi occupied Denmark to Sweden. Approximately 300-600 Jews were rescued by Gerda III. The Danish Parliament donated Gerda III to The Museum of Jewish Heritage in New York City. Mystic Seaport now cares for the vessel and features her as part of their collection of watercraft. The rescue story is the subject of the 1991 film A Day in October and featured in Susan Hood's children's novel, Harboring Hope: The True Story of How Henny Sinding Helped Denmark’s Jews Escape the Nazis (HarperCollins) which won the Josette Frank Award for Fiction from the Children's Book Committee of Bank Street College of Education and was listed as a Best Children's Book of the Year with Outstanding Merit in 2024.
