= Aage and Gerda Bertelsen =

Danish resistance members (1901–1980, ?–?)

Aage Bertelsen
- Born: 6 November 1901
- Died: 15 August 1980 (aged 78)
- Occupations: Teacher, lecturer, headmaster
- Known for: Rescue of Danish Jews and refugees

Gerda Bertelsen
- Known for: Rescue of Danish Jews and refugees

Aage (6 November 1901 – 15 August 1980) and Gerda Bertelsen (?–?) participated in the Danish resistance movement by rescuing Danish Jews and refugees. They were members and leaders of Lyngby group.

Their resistance activity included helping people escape Denmark, developing routes, logistics, and other resistance activities.

== Career ==
Aage had been a teacher in Denmark, but by 1940 he was in Gävle, Sweden, where he taught at a high school. After Denmark came to an understanding with Nazi Germany, without going to war, Aage returned to his family and their house in a town outside of Copenhagen. At some point, Aage was a teacher at the Lyngby State School and a pastor.

== Deportation order ==
Nazi Germany planned to deport all Danish Jews the night of 1–2 October 1943. Rumors of the plans began to circulate throughout Denmark beginning 28 September 1943. Aage took a leave of absence for the month of October from his teaching position. Friends took in the Bartelsens' two children for that time period.

Aage, a pacifist, and Gerda were determined to help the Danish Jews, even though it was illegal with the Nazi Germans. They started by taking in two Jewish children. Aage arranged for sixty people to hide in a school. It was a happy relief for Aage to have a way to oppose the Nazi Germans and save Jews without engaging in warfare.

The couple networked with 120 others in the Lyngby area who wanted to rescue the Jews. They were called the Lyngby group. The group identified hiding places until they had the money to pay willing fishermen to transport the refugees to Sweden. One of the members, David Sompolinsky, wore a blue civilian police uniform at night after curfew when he was guiding other Jews to their hiding places. He appeared to be a policeman searching for Jews and was not questioned about his actions. The Bertelsens established a dispatch office in their home, called the house with the blue curtains, where people would attain visa applications for Sweden. The Bartelsens provided food and care for the refugees. People were taken to boats by taxi. The group transported 1,000 people across the Øresund to Sweden, first from Humlebæk and later further away in Smidstrup.

A Gestapo spy joined the Lyngby group, after which five people were arrested just as a vessel was about to depart from Humlebæk on 28 October 1943. The Bartelsens went into hiding, and Gerda was arrested by the Gestapo at their home after they had been gone a week. She was imprisoned at Vestre Fængsel (Vestre Prison). Aage went to Sweden, where he worked at the Danish university in Lund and continued to work on resistance activities from there. His wife and children remained in Denmark and saw him again after the liberation of Denmark. (Note: Four of the people arrested were imprisoned for five days and released to the Danish police, who let them go. One of the individuals spent two or more months in Horserød camp in Denmark. Other members of the Lyngby group fled to Sweden.)

== After the war ==
Aage returned to teaching and became the Aarhus Cathedral School's principal in 1947. He wrote a book about the Lyngby group's wartime efforts entitled October 1943. He was also active in the peace movement.

== Bibliography ==
- Flender, Harold (1963). Rescue in Denmark. New York : Holocaust Library. ISBN 978-0-89604-018-2.
