= Olfert Fischers Gade =

Street in Copenhagen, Denmark

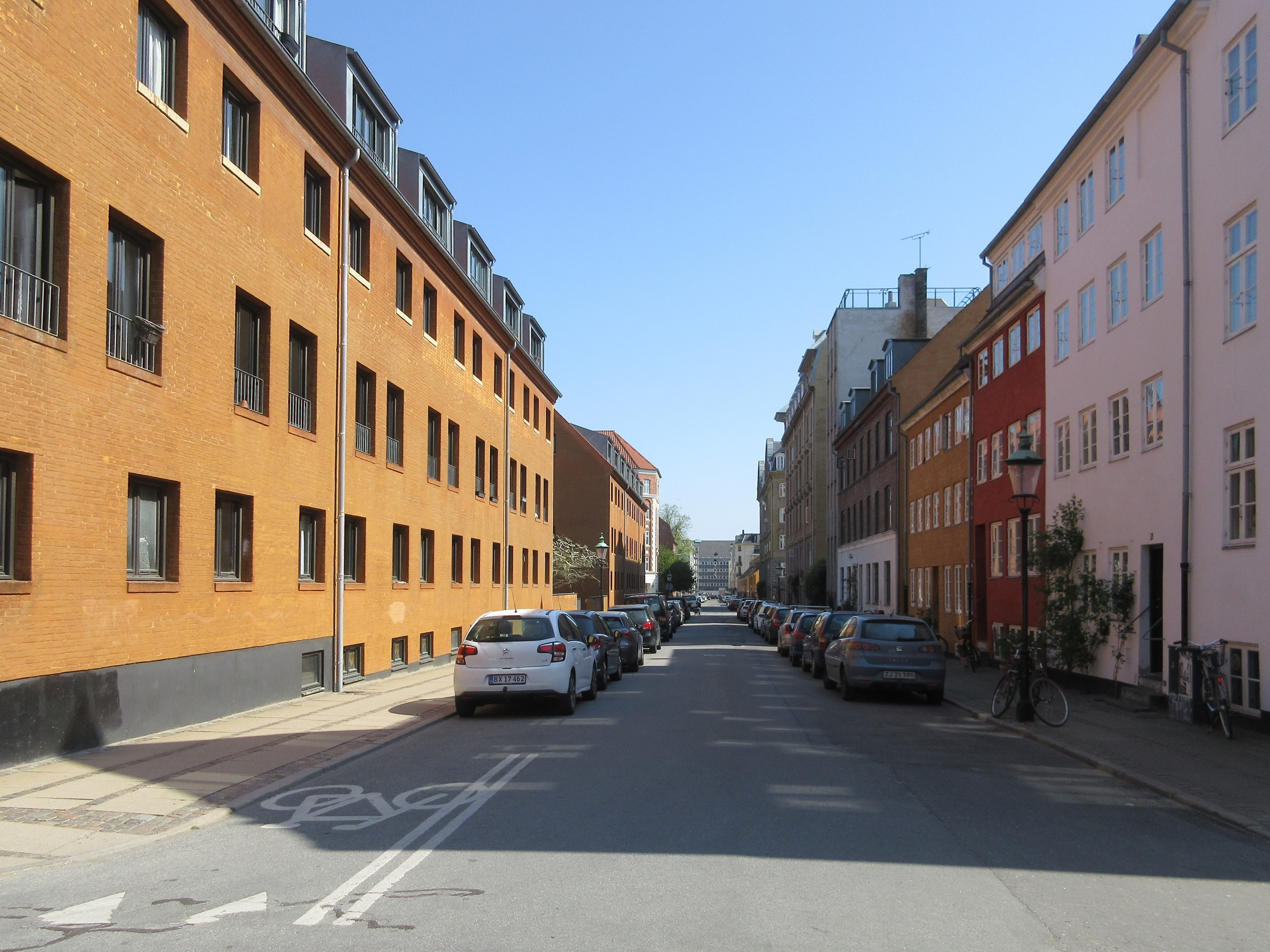
- Olfert Fischers Gade
- Length: 426 m (1,398 ft)
- Location: Copenhagen, Denmark
- Quarter: City centre
- Nearest metro station: Marmorkirken
- Coordinates: 55°41′13.63″N 12°35′13.31″E
- Southeast end: Store Kongensgade
- Northwest end: Rigensgade

Olfert Fischers Gade is a street in the Nyboder Quarter of central Copenhagen, Denmark and is named after the naval officer Olfert Fischer who commanded the Danish fleet in the Battle of Copenhagen in 1801. It runs from Store Kongensgade in the east to Rigensgade in the west, intersecting the streets Borgergade, Adelgade/Sankt Pauls Plads, Gammelvagt and Kronprinsessegade on the way. The street is closed to through traffic on the west side of Borgergade.

== History ==
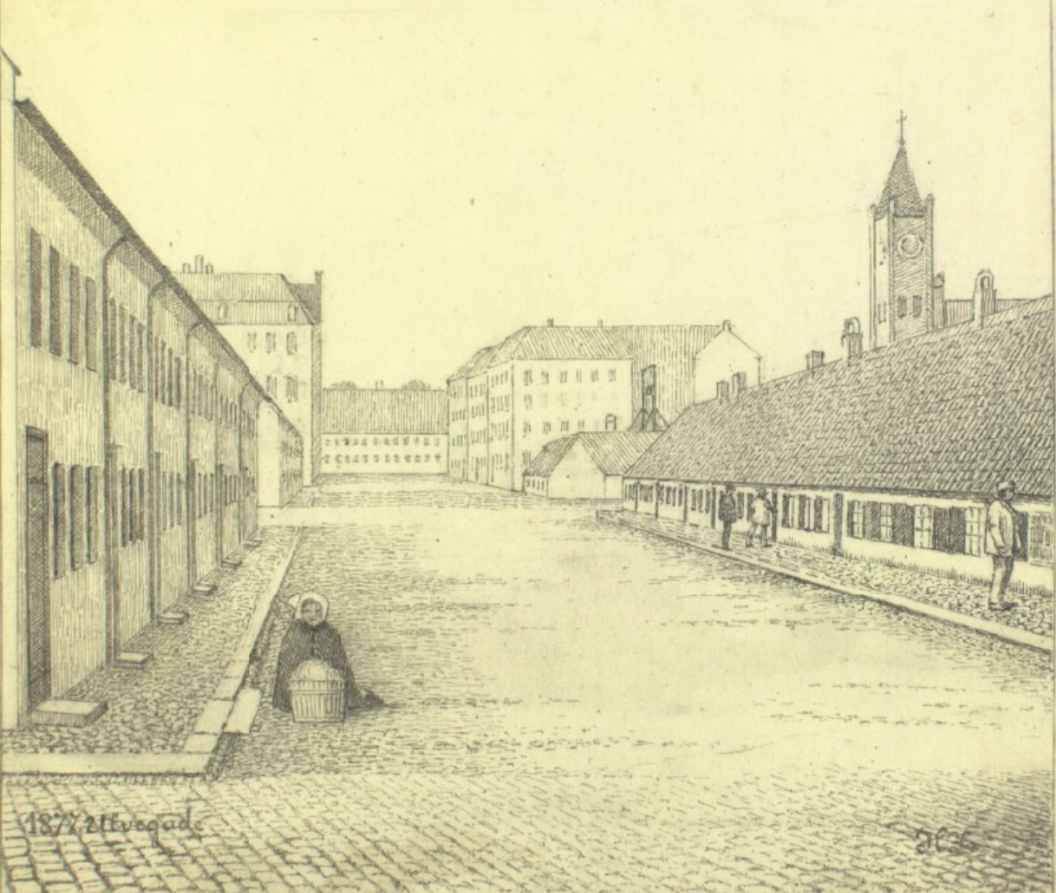
Ulvegade in 1877

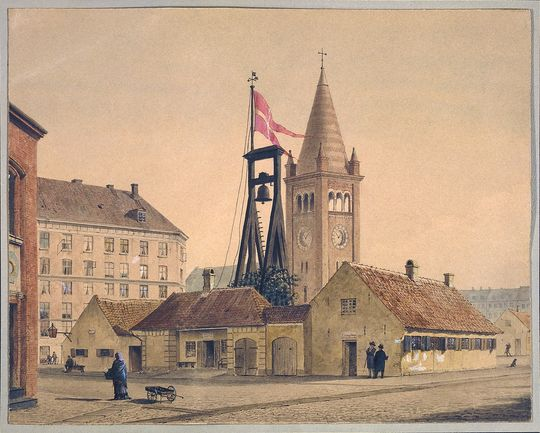
The street with 1880

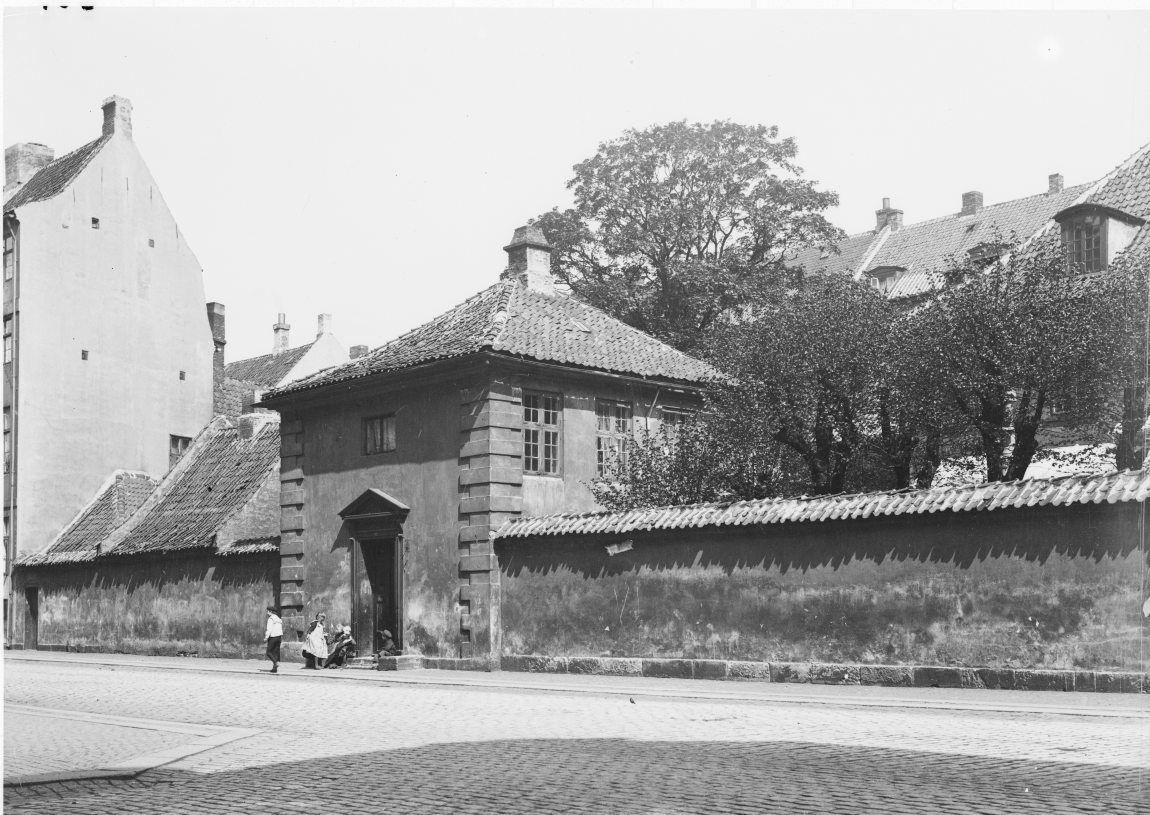
The main entrance of Søetatens Gospital in Balsamgade

Olfert Fischers Gade traces its history back to Christian IV's foundation of Nyboder naval barracks in 1931 but different sections of it were then known under individual names. The section from Store Kongensgade was called Bryggerlængen (The Brewer Row), presumedly because a brewery was located at the site. The section from Borgergade to Adelgade was called Ulvegade (Wolf Street) and the section from Adelgade was called Balsamgade. The streets in Nyboder were named after animals and plants. These two names followed Christian IV's decision to name the streets in the eastern part of Nyboder after animal species and the streets in the western part after plant species. The area was located outside the city until Copenhagen's East Rampart was moved in 1661. This had already been planned by Christian IV but had been delayed due to lack of funding. Søetatens Hospital that replaced Søkvæsthuset, a naval hospital, was from 1806 located in Balsamgade. It closed in 1864. Nyboder's police station and jailhouse was located just around the corner in Adelgade. Adelgade then crossed the street a little further to the west, where Gammelvagt runs today, but the street was straightened in the 1990s.

The three streets were jointly named Olfert Fischers Gade in 1897. This was done at the initiative of city engineer Thorvald Krak to reduce the number of street names in the city.

== Notable buildings and residents ==
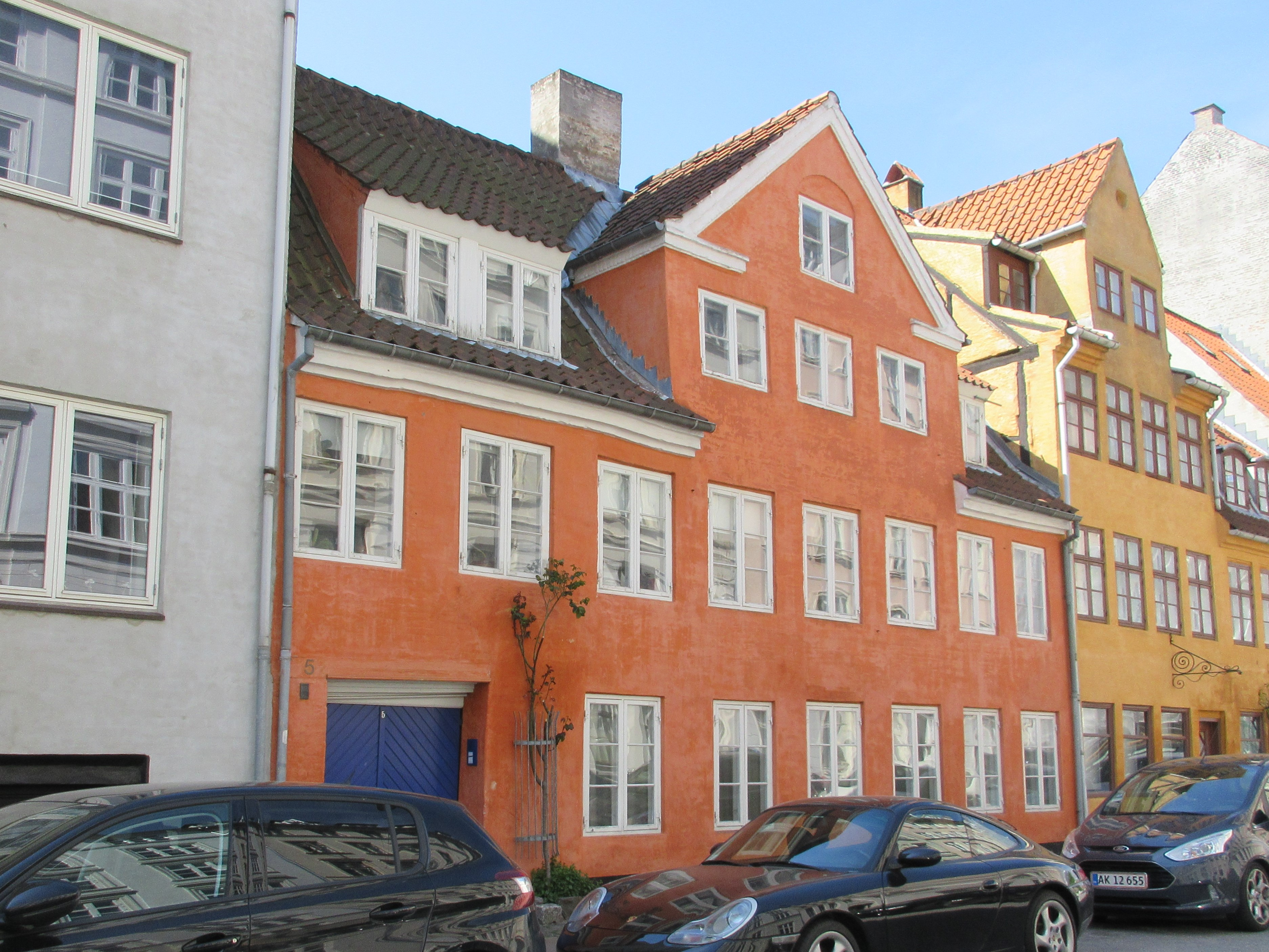
Np. 5-7

The three small townhouses at No. 5-7 are among the oldest buildings in the street and have been listed on the Danish Registry of Protected Buildings and Places. No. 5 dates from the early 18th century, Ut is built over eight bays in two storeys and has a three-bay gabled wall dormer. No. 7 consists of two townhouses. The eastern one was originally built at some point before 1740 but was heightened between 1740 and 1766. The one to the west dates from before 1767 but was adapted with a Mansard roof some time 1767 and 1788between.

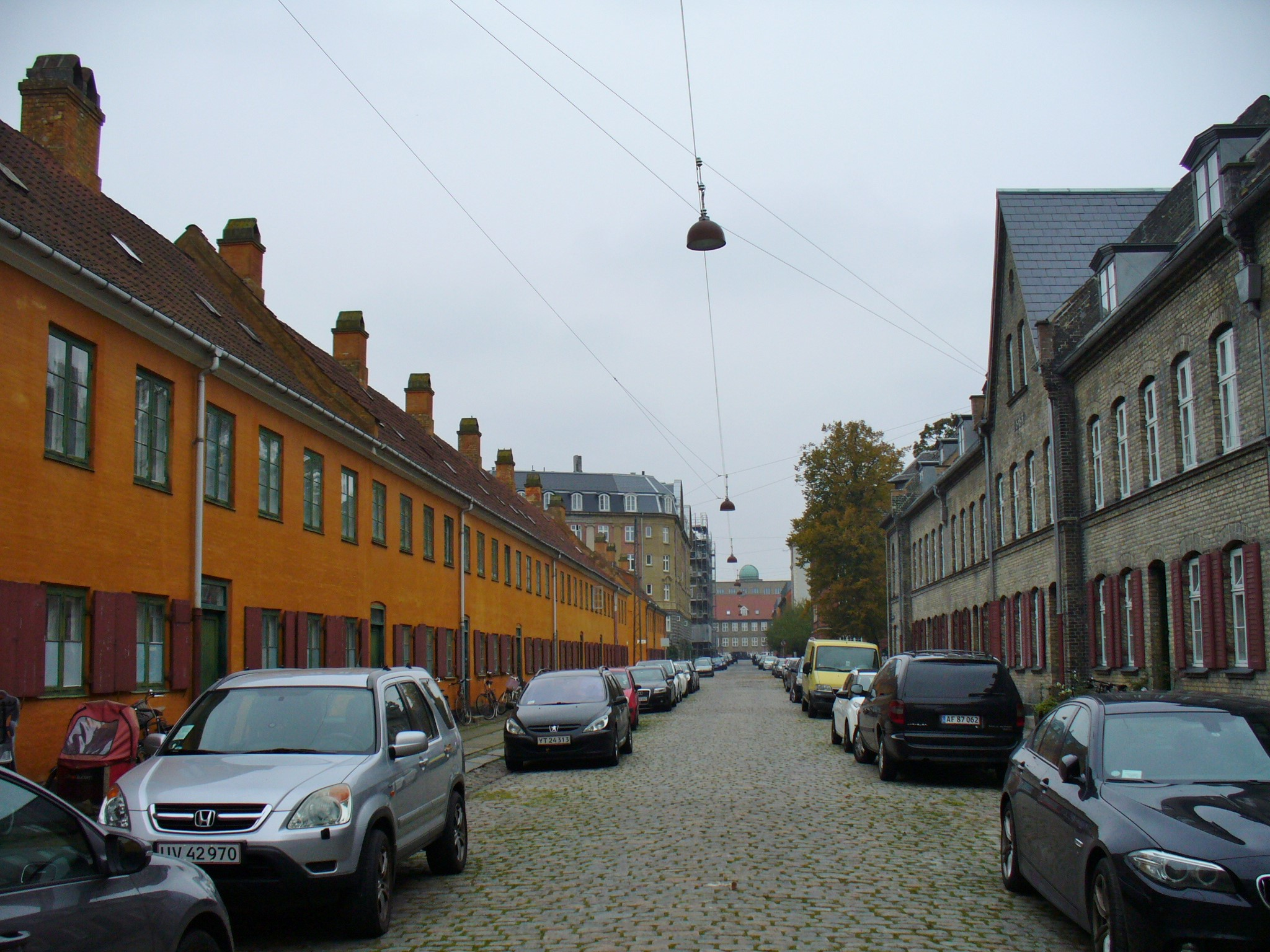
Classic yellow Nyboder houses to the left and a Grey Row to the right

The central portion of the street, between Borgergade and Adelgade, is lined with Nyboder houses but do not date from Christian IV's original development but represent later models. On the south side of the street (No. 19-37) is an example of the two-storey yellow terraces that are not most commonly associated with the development. It dates from the 1750s and was designed by Philip de Lange. On the north side of the street (No. 16-32 ), is an example of the so-called Grey Roys (or New Rows) that were built in the late 1880s and early 1890s to design by Olaf Schmidth and Rasmus Rue. The new design was inspired by Arbejdernes Byggeforening's building society houses.
