= Georg Ferdinand Duckwitz =

German diplomat and Righteous Among the Nations

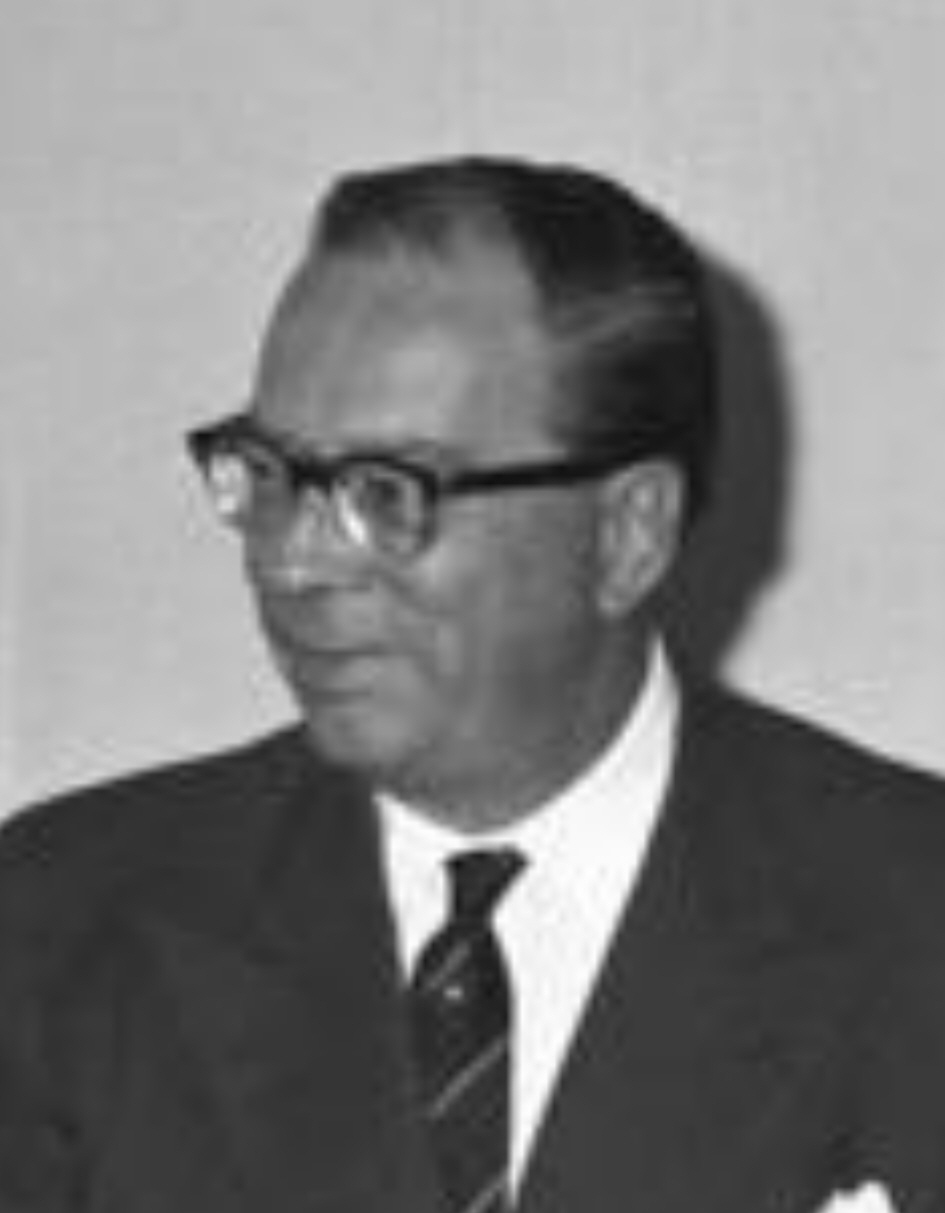
Georg Ferdinand Duckwitz in 1960

Georg Ferdinand Duckwitz (German: [ˈɡeːɔʁk ˈfɛʁdinant ˈdʊkvɪts]; 29 September 1904, Bremen – 16 February 1973) was a German diplomat. During World War II, he served as an attaché for Nazi Germany in occupied Denmark. He tipped off the Danes about the Germans' intended deportation of the Jewish population in 1943 and arranged for their reception in Sweden. Danish resistance groups subsequently rescued 95% of Denmark's Jewish population. Israel has designated Duckwitz as one of the Righteous Among the Nations.

== Early life ==
Duckwitz was born on 29 September 1904 in Bremen, Germany, to an old patrician family in the Hanseatic City. After college, he began a career in the international coffee trade.

== Career ==
From 1928 to 1932 Duckwitz lived in Copenhagen, Denmark. In November 1932, he met Gregor Strasser, the leader of the leftist branch of the German nationalistic Nazi Party, in Bremen. Throughout their conversation, Duckwitz found that "elements of Scandinavian socialism [were] connected with nationalistic feelings" and decided to enroll in the party. On 1 July 1933, he joined the Nazi Party's Office of Foreign Affairs in Berlin. Throughout his tenure, he became increasingly disillusioned by Nazi politics. In a 4 June 1935 letter to Alfred Rosenberg, the head of the office, he wrote, "My two-year employment in the Reichsleitung [i.e. executive branch] of the [Nazi Party] has made me realize that I am so fundamentally deceived in the nature and purpose of the National Socialist movement that I am no longer able to work within this movement as an honest person". Around the same time, the Gestapo (secret police) made its first notes on Duckwitz after he had sheltered three Jewish women in his Kurfürstendamm apartment during a local antisemitic Sturmabteilung event. He later wrote that he had then become "a fierce opponent of this [Nazi] system".

He eventually left the Office of Foreign Affairs to work for the Hamburg America Line shipping company. In 1939, he was assigned to the German embassy in Copenhagen as a maritime attaché.

=== Rescue of Jews in Denmark ===
After 1942, Duckwitz worked with the Nazi Reich representative Werner Best, who organised the Gestapo. On 11 September 1943, Best told Duckwitz that all Danish Jews were to be arrested on 1 October. In response, Duckwitz travelled to Berlin to try to prevent the operation by appealing to the authorities. He failed to convince them, and he flew to Stockholm two weeks later, ostensibly to discuss the passage of German merchant ships. There, he contacted Swedish Prime Minister Per Albin Hansson and asked whether Sweden would be willing to receive Danish Jewish refugees. In a couple of days, Hansson promised them a favourable reception.

Back in Denmark on 29 September, Duckwitz contacted the Danish Social Democrat Hans Hedtoft and notified him of the intended deportation. Hedtoft warned the head of the Jewish community, C. B. Henriques, and the acting chief rabbi, Marcus Melchior, who spread the warning. Sympathetic Danes in all walks of life organized a mass escape of over 7,200 Jews and 700 of their non-Jewish relatives by sea to Sweden.

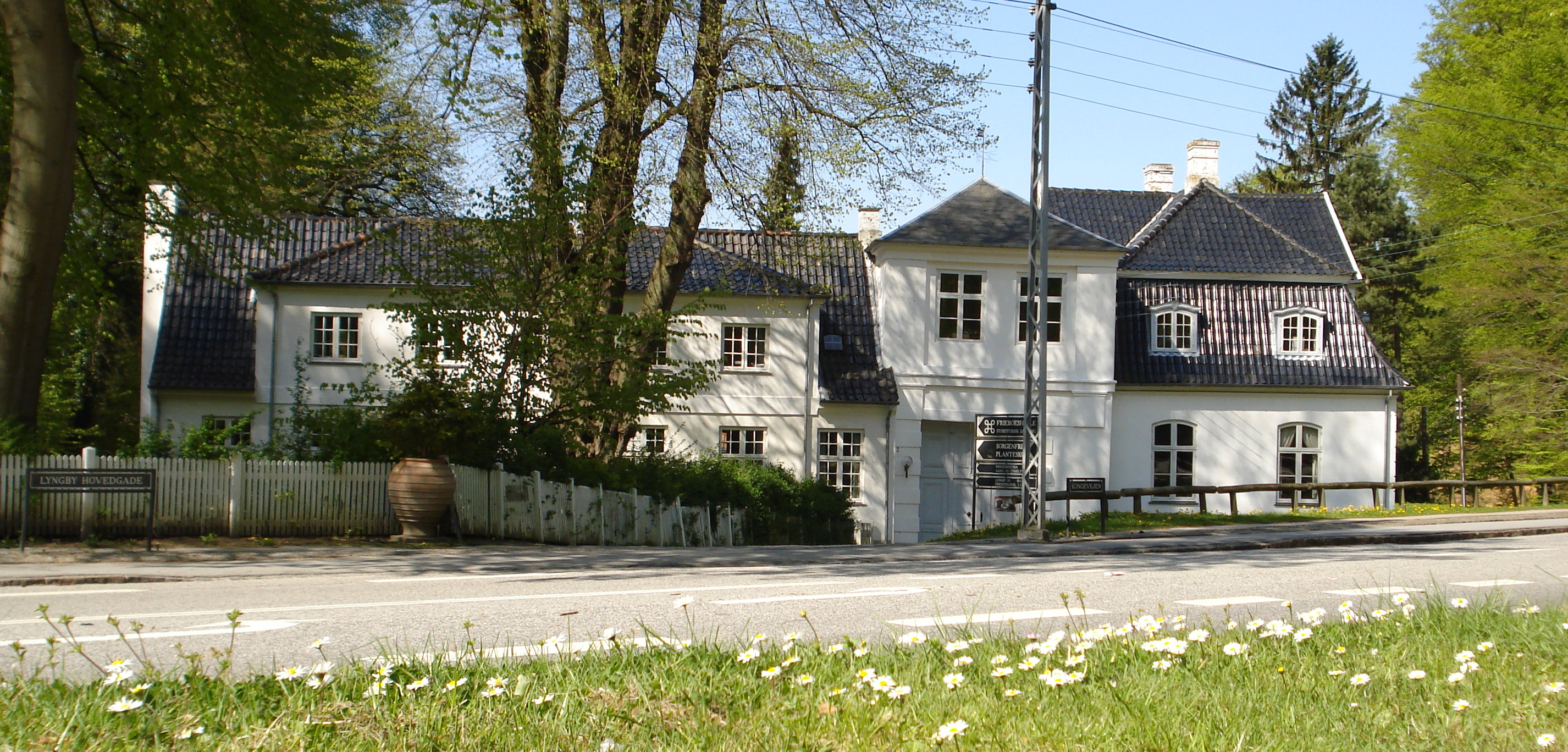
Duckwitz lived in Frieboeshvile Lyngby Hovedgade 2, Kongens Lyngby.

Afterward, Duckwitz went back to his official duties.

== Later life ==
After the war, Duckwitz remained in the German foreign service. In 1955 to 1958, he served as West German ambassador to Denmark and later as the ambassador to India. When Willy Brandt became Foreign Minister in 1966, he made Duckwitz Secretary of State in West Germany's Foreign Office. After Brandt became Chancellor, he ordered Duckwitz to negotiate an agreement with the Polish government. Brandt's work culminated in the 1970 Treaty of Warsaw. Duckwitz worked as Secretary of State until his retirement in 1970. On 21 March 1971, the Israeli government named him Righteous Among the Nations and included him in the Yad Vashem memorial. He died two years later, at age 68.

== Legacy ==
Duckwitz was portrayed by Patrick Malahide in the film Miracle at Midnight.

He is depicted in the 2026 movie The Swedish Connection, played by Frantisek Oliver Cziky, during the events leading up to the Rescue of the Danish Jews.
