= Leif B. Hendil =

Danish journalist (1898–1961)

- Born: Leif Bøving Hendil; 7 December 1898
- Died: 20 June 1961 (aged 62)
- Occupations: Journalist, editor-in-chief
- Known for: Rescuing 1,888 Danish Jews and Refugees via his Danish-Swedish Refugee Service

Leif Bøving Hendil (7 December 1898 – 20 June 1961) was a Danish journalist responsible for safely transporting 1,888 Jewish–Danish refugees from Denmark to Sweden during the Second World War.

A journalist and editor-in-chief, he was a member of the Overseas Writing Club and presented a Dane ax to General George C. Marshall in 1949. He wrote the book Island: en del af Norden (Iceland: part of the Nordic region), published in 1952.

== Personal life and career ==
Leif Bøving Hendil was born on 7 December 1898. Hendil was hired at Ekstra Bladet in Copenhagen in 1925. He became its commercial editor in 1933 and editor-in-chief after the war. Hendil retired in 1958.

He lived in Copenhagen, and a summer residence in Snekkersten, Denmark. He lived in Malmö, Sweden during the war. Hendil died on 20 June 1961.

== World War II ==
Hendil helped friends leave Denmark for Sweden. In the autumn of 1943, Hendil left Denmark for the neutral country.

After 29 Aug. 1943 (when information began to be circulated that the Nazi Germans were going to deport all Danish Jews on 1 and 2 October), Hendil began to plan for routes to transport Danish refugees to Sweden. Coordinated with an innkeeper named Thomsen at Snekkersten Kro (Snekkersten Inn), 50 people were taken to Sweden. In Sweden, he planned the logistics of bringing Danish Jews to Sweden with Ebbe Munck and Swedish Jewish leaders. Hendil agreed to develop the routes and means to transport people for over SEK 160,000. (Note: Munck coordinated funds throughout the war. Refugees provided IOUs for the cost of transit, which were repaid after the war.) He headquartered his organization Dansk-Swedish Refugee Service (Danish-Swedish Refugee Service), at the Hotel Adlon in Malmö, where people traveled in one of three initial boats, one named Julius, that would take them between Denmark and Sweden. He initially had six employees who ran the boats. He collaborated with Robert Jensen ("Tom"), a radio dealer in Copenhagen, to transport people to and from the embarkation points.

Hendil's vessels also transported children, school books, and Bibles, as well as weapons, money, and mail.

There were several methods and embarkation points used to ensure the safety of the passengers; one was,

During the boats' first busy period, when the Jews were being sped to Sweden, passengers had to embark in the daytime in Copenhagen's busiest harbours. The Germans hired civilian informers to watch the boats, but the Danes contrived to fool them. When the boats were docked, Danes streamed steadily on and off them, so that no matter how carefully the spies watched, they could never keep an accurate count of how many people remained aboard. Secret passenger compartments in many of the larger trawlers and coasters took hours for the Germans to find, so they began using search dogs.

Hendil had a powder of cocaine and dried blood made to make the dogs ineffective. The captains of the boats would blow their nose and shake out their handkerchiefs, spreading the powder, which stymied the dog's ability to locate people.

The logistics changed after the "Julius Affair" on 11 December 1943 when a German patrol boat interfered with a slow-moving boat. Swedish and Danish boats then met at pre-arranged positions in Øresund, exchanging passengers and mail. As Nazi Germany increased its presence, the ferry service operated out of fishing villages, like Klintholm Havn, further from Sweden. It was a longer but safer boat ride.

By the war's end, he had safely transported 1,888 Danish Jews and refugees and up to 2,000 people, including Allied civilians and military personnel. An Englishman, Frank Pinnock, crossed Øresund several times. Hendil changed the labels in his clothes, his shoes, his identification, and the contents of his pockets to appear to be a Dane. He was also told to pretend he was a deaf-mute man. By the end of the war, he had eleven boats.

Hendil's temperament caused him to be described as "a man of the fight, loved by the numerous he helped, feared by others whose behavior he wanted of life."

== Other interests ==
At an Overseas Writer's Club meeting at the National Press Club in Washington, D.C., Hendril awarded General George C. Marshall with an ancient Danish battle ax in September 1949.

Hendil, called an aviation expert by The Edmonton Bulletin, was involved in establishing an airline route between Greenland and Copenhagen in 1934. Hendil flew around the globe within seven days in November 1948. He flew by a series of commercial airline flights, returning to his starting point in Copenhagen. The total flight, including the estimated flight time from New York to Copenhagen, was six days, 23 hours and 30 minutes.

In 1952, he published the book Island: en del af Norden (Iceland: part of the Nordic region).

== Bibliography ==
- Lampe, David (2011). Hitler's savage canary : a history of the Danish resistance in World War II. Barnsley, S. Yorkshire : Frontline Books; New York : Skyhorse Pub. ISBN 978-1-84832-574-6.
