= Ranks and insignia of the National Socialist Workers' Party of Denmark =

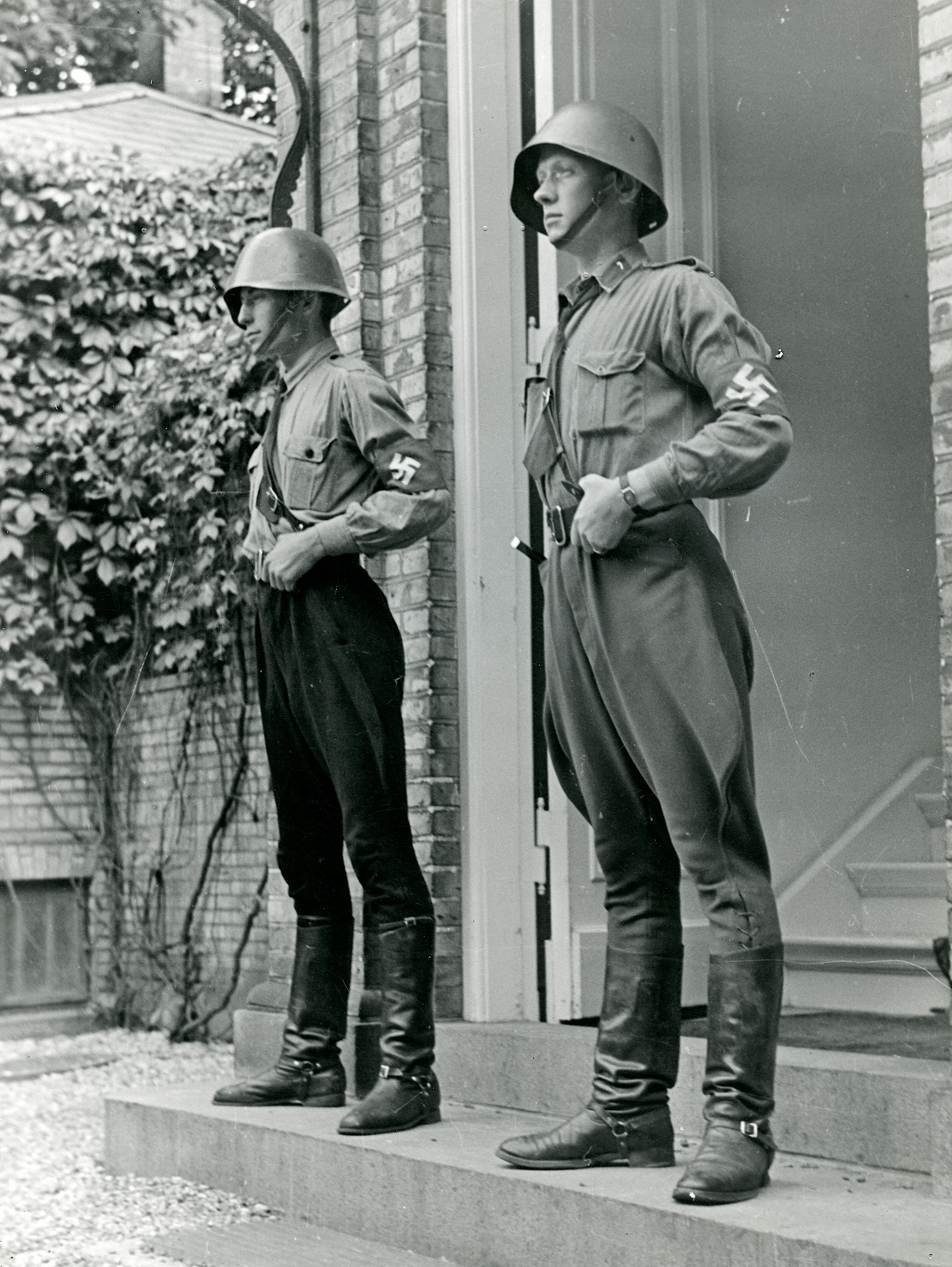
Members of the DNSAP's Storm Afdeling (SA) guarding the Copenhagen recruitment office for Danish Waffen-SS volunteers during World War II. The men wear paramilitary "brownshirt" uniforms with M1923 helmets and swastika armbands in red and white. (Photo: National Museum of Denmark)

The ranks and insignia of the National Socialist Workers' Party of Denmark were the paramilitary rank system used by the National Socialist Workers' Party of Denmark (Danmarks Nationalsocialistiske Arbejderparti, abbr. DNSAP) in Denmark during World War II. Initially, the DNSAP, along with all other political parties in Denmark, were not allowed to wear ranks as part of the Danish prohibition of uniforms (Danish: Uniformsforbud). It was only after the German invasion of Denmark DNSAP began to wear ranks and uniforms.

== General ranks ==
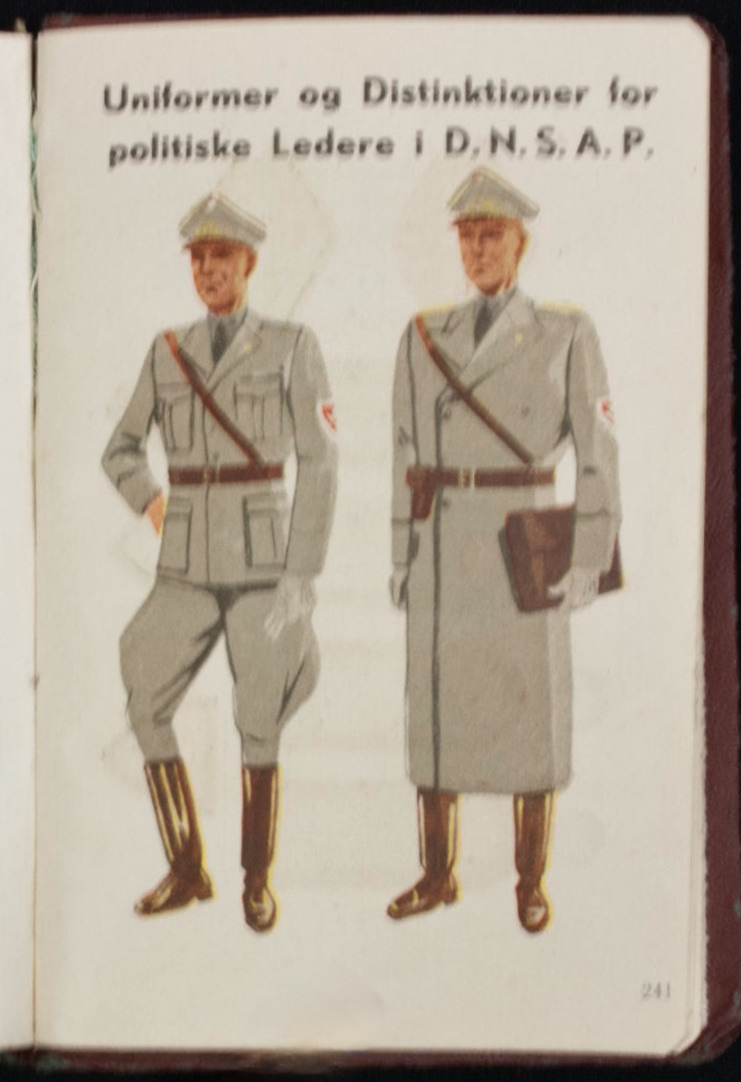
DNSAP pocket calendar 1943: Uniforms for "political leaders".

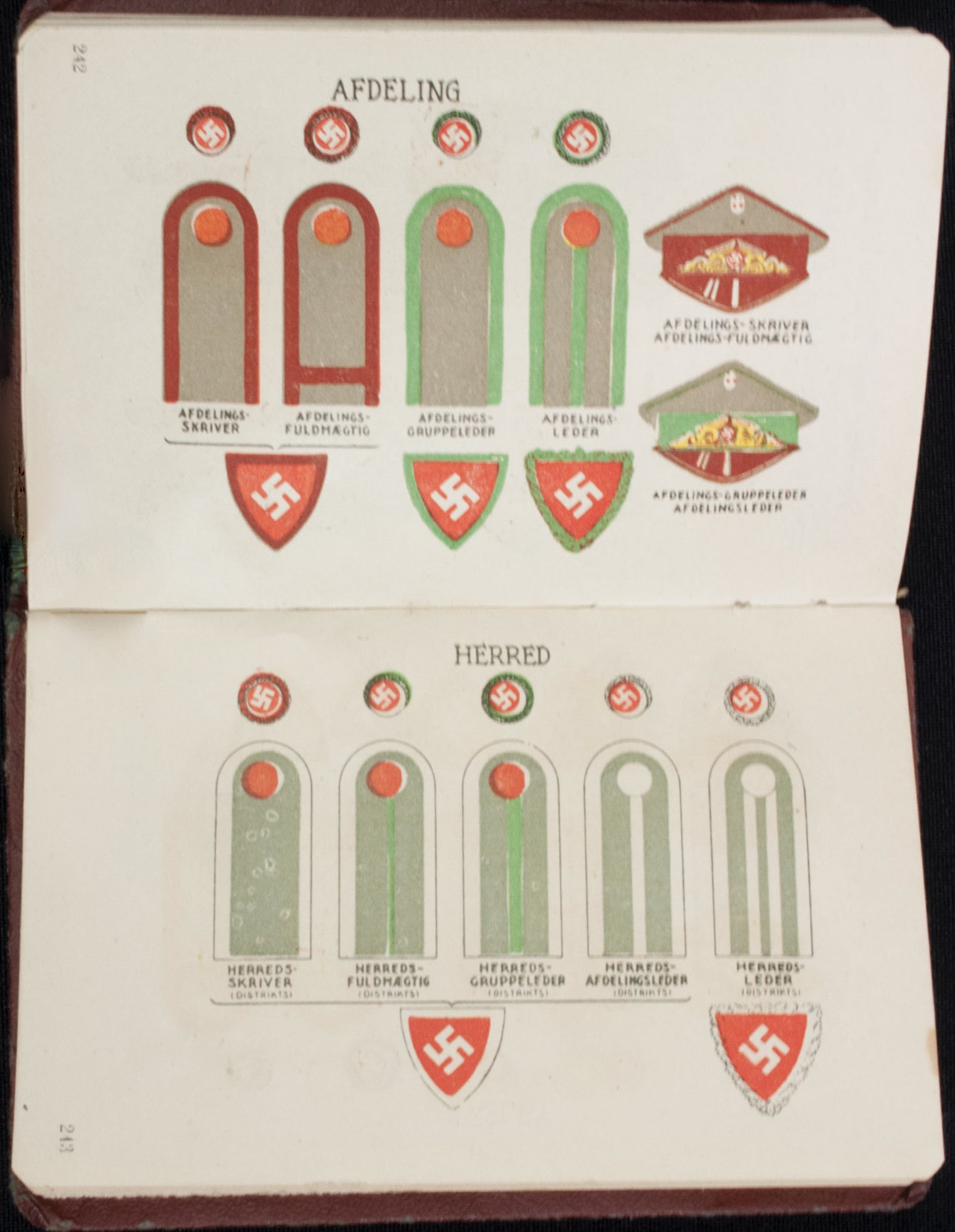
DNSAP pocket calendar 1943: Insigia, etc. for "political leaders"

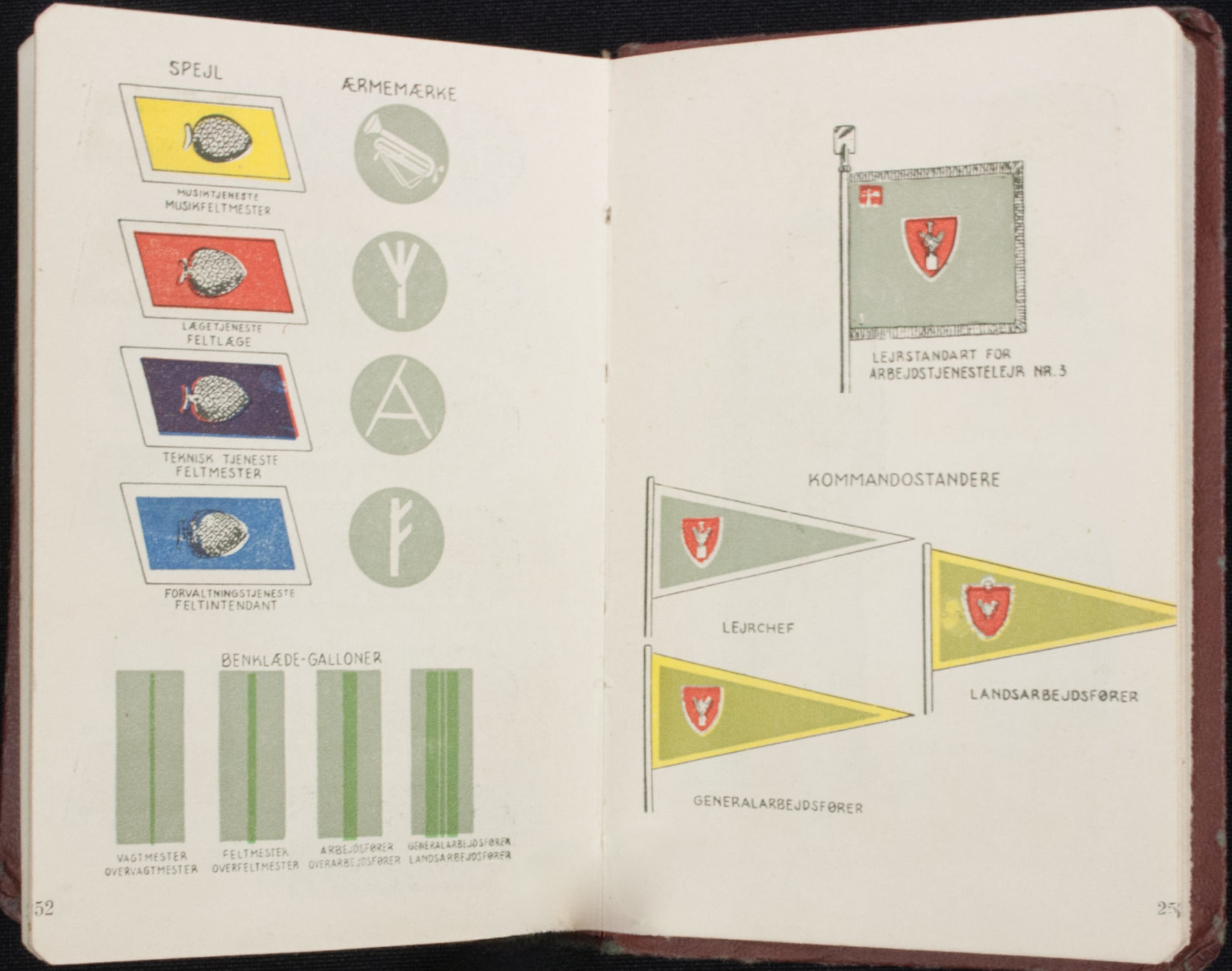
DNSAP pocket calendar 1943: Uniform insignia and flags.

The DNSAP was the largest Danish Nazi party, founded in 1930 and taken over by Frits Clausen in 1933. Despite being a relatively small party, it was highly structured, with 15 Sysseler (main districts) in Denmark and two abroad (one in Germany and one in Norway). These districts were further divided into Herreder ("hundreds") and Afdelinger (departments).

The party had its own Corps of Political Leaders, who wore military-style uniforms, consisting of a greenish-brown tunic, breeches, brown top boots, a light green shirt, a dark green tie, and a peaked cap. The cap badge varied by rank, featuring a white swastika on red within a white circle, while another badge on the cap had the white cross of Denmark on a red oval. A white swastika on a red shield was worn on the left upper arm, and there were twelve shield variants depending on rank. The rank insignia appeared on the shoulder straps, with colors like brown, green, silver, or gold indicating ascending ranks.

The uniforms came into being only after the occupation. There have been raised questions about the practicality of the DNSAP's extensive rank system, suggesting it may have been more about creating an illusion of a large organization rather than reflecting actual power or influence.

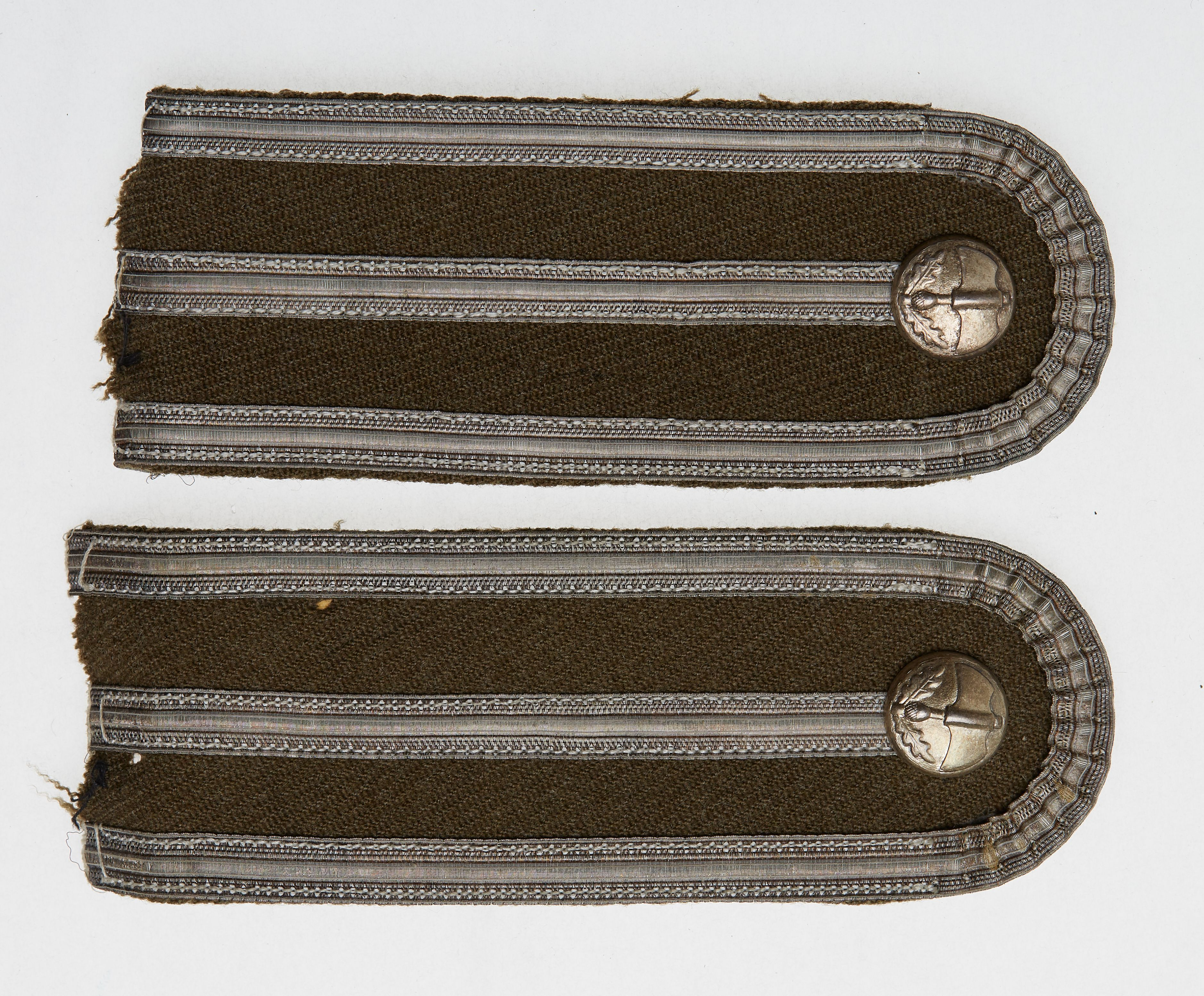
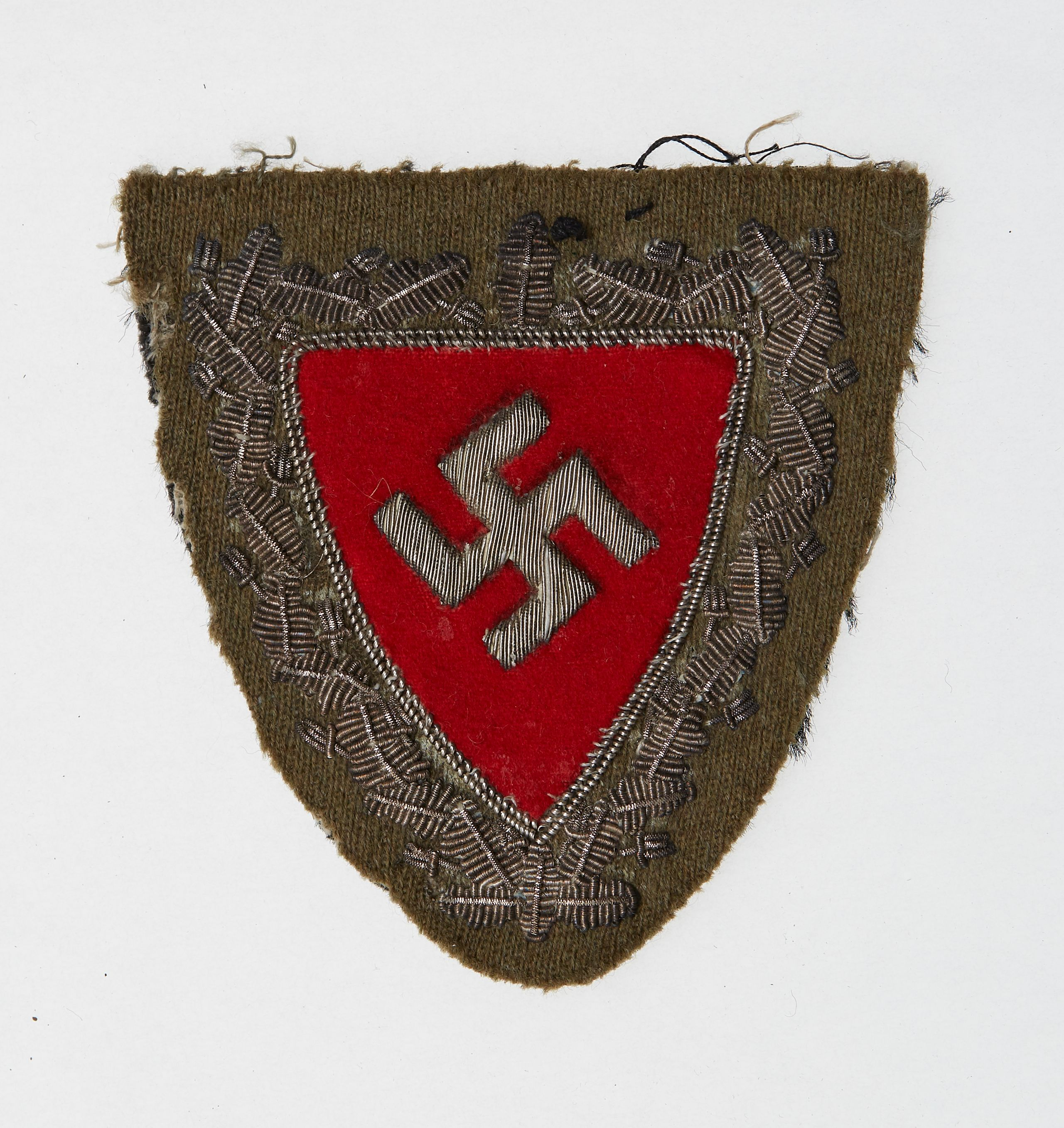
Shoulder	Sleeve	Rank	Translation
Party leadership
		Partileder	Party leader
National leadership
		Landsleder	National leader
		Landsafdelingsleder	National department leader
		Landsgruppeleder	National group leader
		Landsfuldmægtig	National head clerk
		Landsskriver	National clerk
Syssel staff
		Stabsafdelingsleder	Staff department leader
		Stabsgruppeleder	Staff group leader
		Stabsfuldmægtig	Staff head clerk
		Stabsskriver	Staff clerk
Syssel
		Syssel leder	Syssel leader
		Syssel afdelingsleder	Syssel department leader
		Syssel gruppeleder	Syssel group leader
		Syssel fuldmægtig	Syssel head clerk
		Syssel skriver	Syssel clerk
Herred
		Herredsleder	Hundred leader
		Herredsafdelingsleder	Hundred department leader
		Herredsgruppeleder	Hundred group leader
		Herredsfuldmægtig	Hundred head clerk
		Herredsskriver	Hundred clerk
Afdeling
		Afdelingsleder	Department leader
		Afdelingsgruppeleder	Department group leader
		Afdelingsfuldmægtig	Department head clerk
		Afdelingsskriver	Department clerk

== Hird and Skjoldunge ==
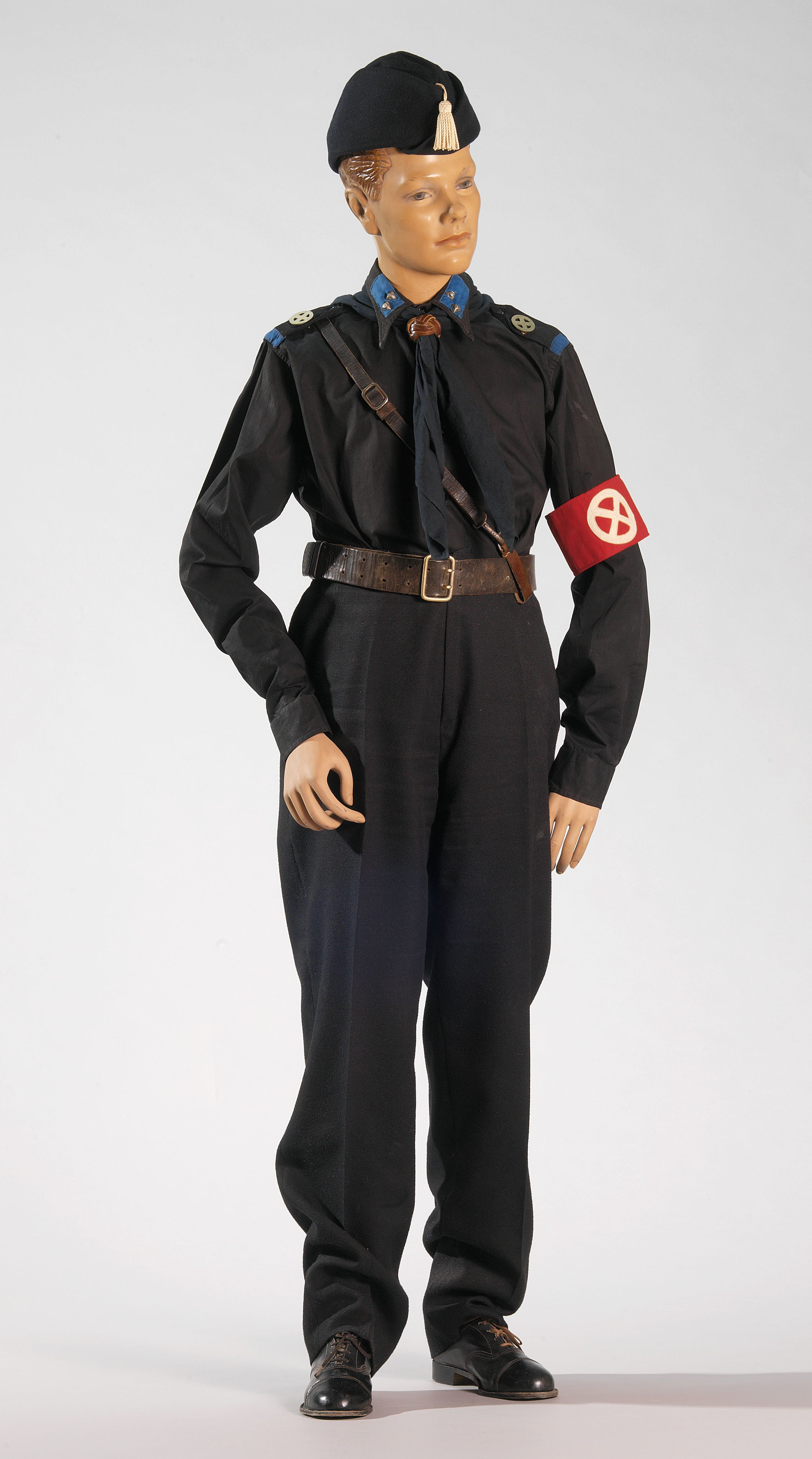
Black uniform for the youth organization NSU of DNSAP, introduced by Landsungdomsfører Christian Frederik von Schalburg in 1940, with sunwheel armband, crossbelt and side cap with tassel. (National Museum of Denmark)

Danmarks Nationalsocialistiske Ungdom (transl. National Socialist Youth, abbr. N.S.U.) was the youth organisation within the DNSAP, created in 1934.

Collar	Shoulder	Rank	Translation
		Landsungdomsfører	National youth leader
		Storbannefører	Senior banner leader
		Bannefører	Banner leader
		Stammefører	Unit leader
		Storhirdfører	Senior hird leader
		Hirdfører	Hird leader
		Følgefører	Companion leader
		Hirdmand or Skjoldunge	Hird Man or Shield child

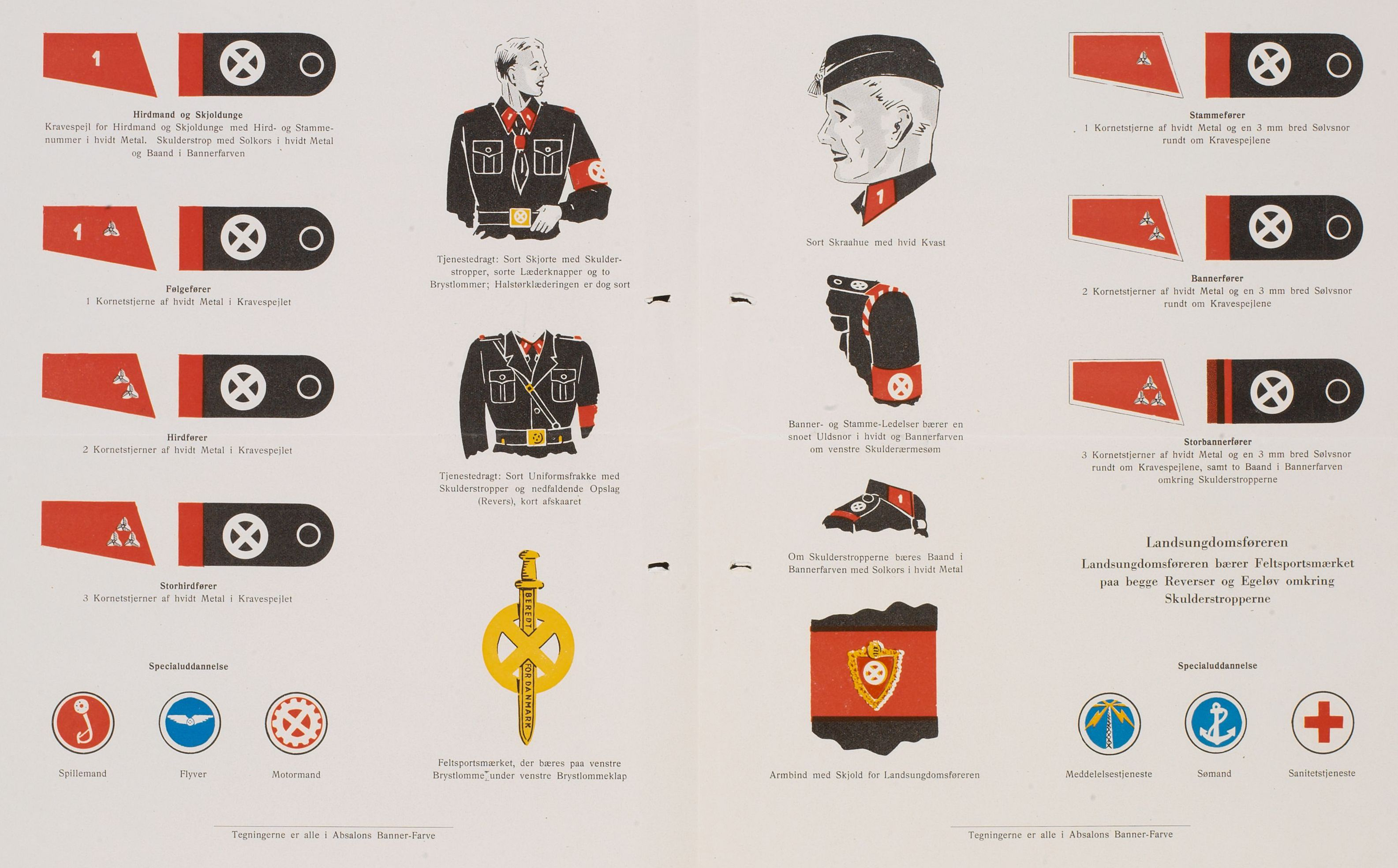
DNSAP Danish Nazi Party Youth and their uniform, 1940.

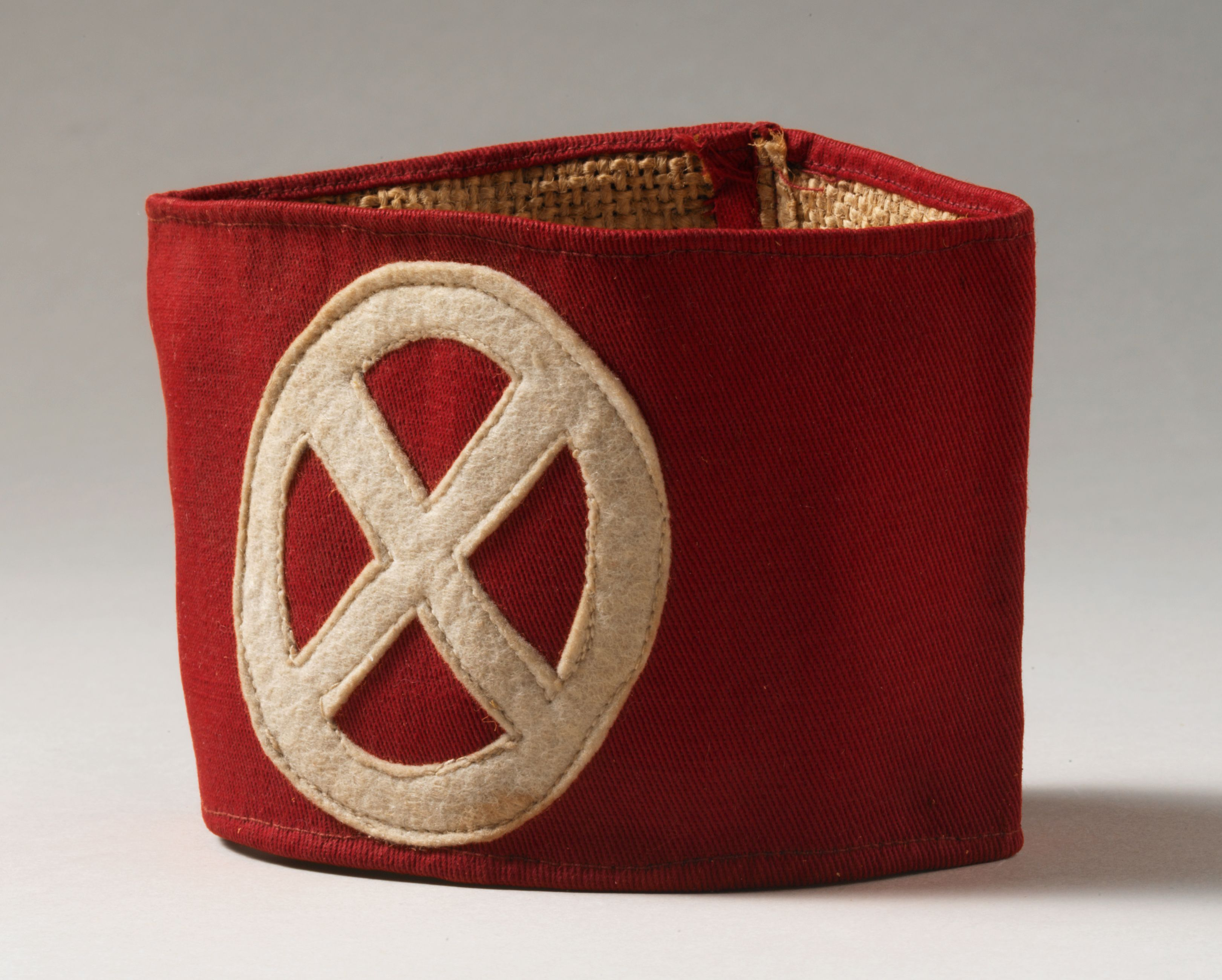
DNSAP Danish Nazi Party Youth organization, 1940.

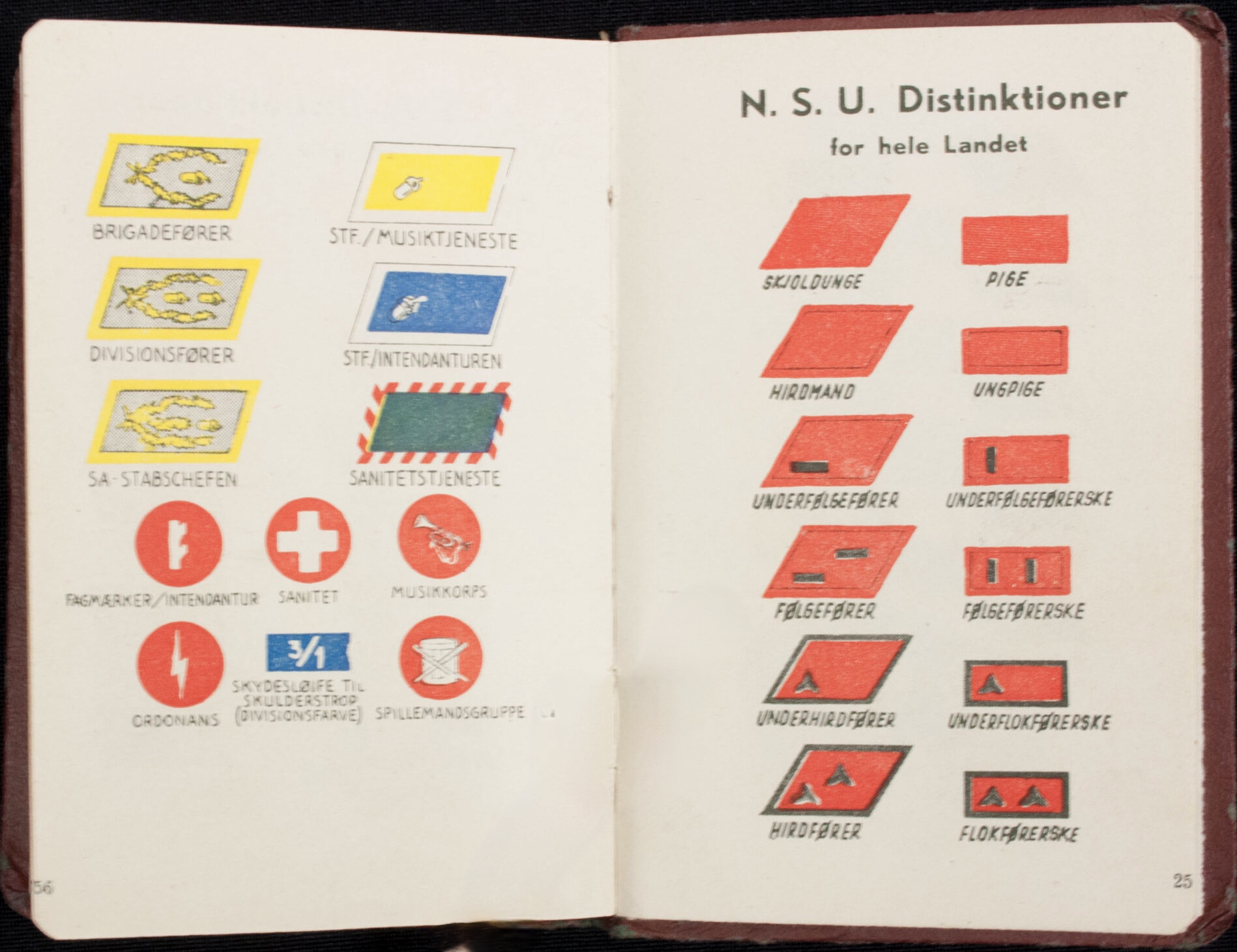
NSU Paramilitary insignia Youth, 1943.

== Storm Afdeling ==
Emblem of the Storm Afdeling, the paramilitary units of the DNSAP

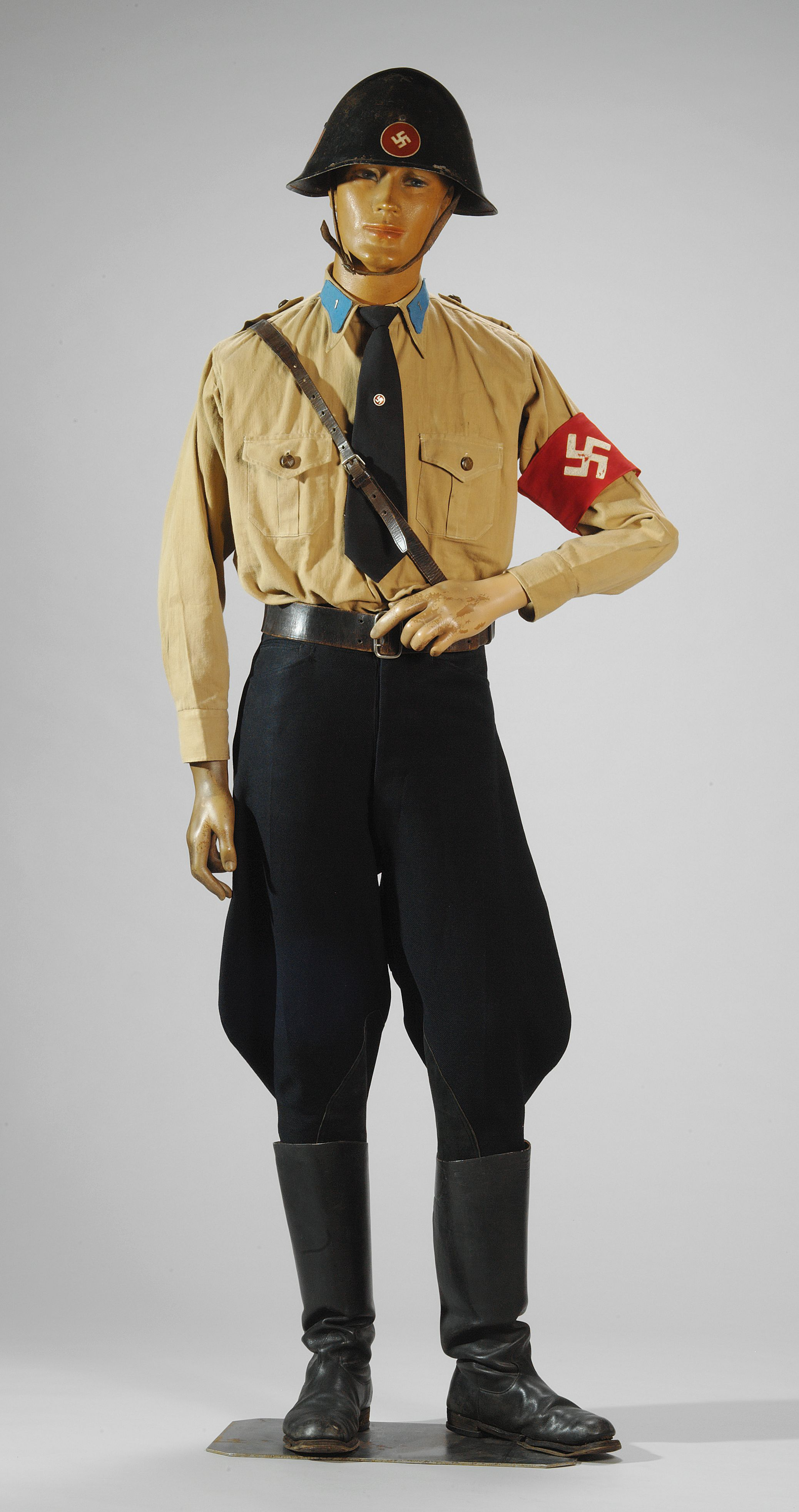
Paramilitary uniform of the Storm Afdeling, the "storm troopers" of DNSAP. With swastika armband, steel helmet, brownshirt and riding breeches. (National Museum of Denmark)

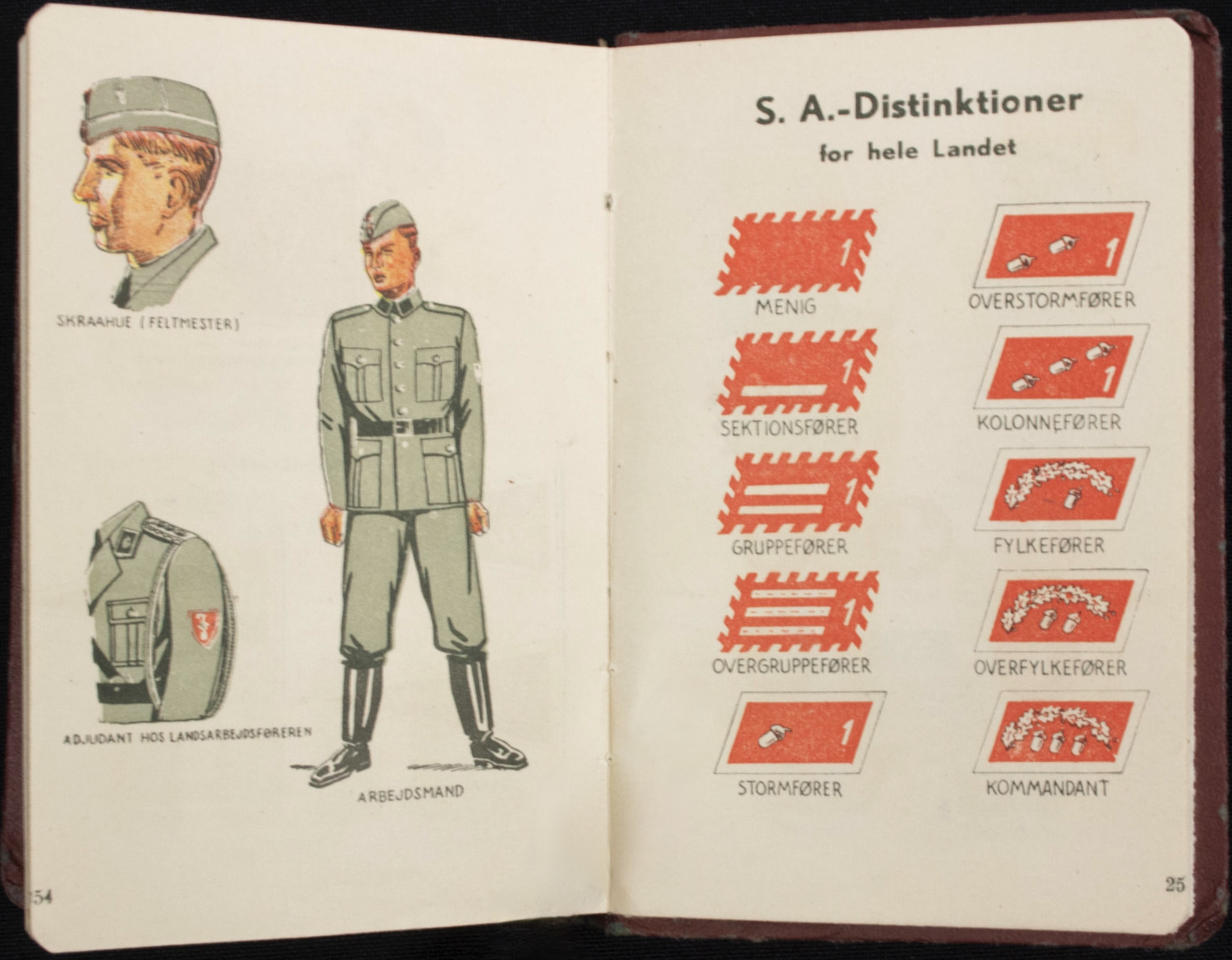
Danish Nazi Party agenda pocket calendar 1943: Uniforms and distinctions of the Storm Afdeling (SA).

The Storm Afdeling (transl. Storm Troopers) was based on the Sturmabteilung.

Initially, there were seven ranks in the SA:

- Øverste SA-Fører (Supreme leader of the storm troopers)
- SA-Divisionsfører (Leader of several Columns)
- SA-Kolonnensfører (Leader a Column of 3 or 4 Storms)
- SA-Stormfører (Leader of a Storm of four Groups)
- SA-Gruppefører (Leader of a Group of 10-20 men)
- SA-Sektionsfører (Leader of a Section of 3-9 men)
- SA-Mænd (Storm Trooper)

The ranks were later expanded:

Collar insignia	SA Rank	Translation
	SA-Stabschefen	Chief of staff
	SA-Divisionsfører	Division leader
	SA-Brigadefører	Brigade leader
	SA-Kommandant	Commandant
	SA-Overfylkefører	Senior district leader
	SA-Fylkefører	District leader
	SA-Kolonnensfører	Column leader
	SA-Overstormfører	Senior assault leader
	SA-Stormfører	Assault leader
	SA-Overgruppefører	Senior group leader
	SA-Gruppefører	Group leader
	SA-Sektionsfører	Section leader
	SA-Menig	Private

== Landsarbejdstjenesten ==
The Landsarbejdstjeneste (transl. National Labour Service) was created on 20 April 1941 and was based on the German Reich Labour Service.

Collar	Shoulder	Rank (German)	Translation	Danish Army equivalent
		Landsarbejdsfører (Reichsarbeitsführer)	National labour leader
		Generalarbejdsfører (Generalarbeitsführer)	General labour leader	General
		Overarbejdsfører (Oberarbeitsführer)	Senior labour leader	Colonel
		Arbejdsfører (Arbeitsführer)	Labour leader	Lieutenant colonel
		Overfeltmester (Oberfeldmeister)	Senior field master	Captain
		Feltmester (Feldmeister)	Field master	Lieutenant
		Overvagtmester (Oberwachtmeister)	Senior watch-master	Officiant
		Vagtmester (Wachtmeister)	Watch-master	Sergeant
		Overtropsfører (Obertruppführer)	Senior troop leader	Corporal
		Tropsfører (Truppführer)	Troop leader	Junior corporal
		Arbejdsmand (Arbeitsmann)	Working man

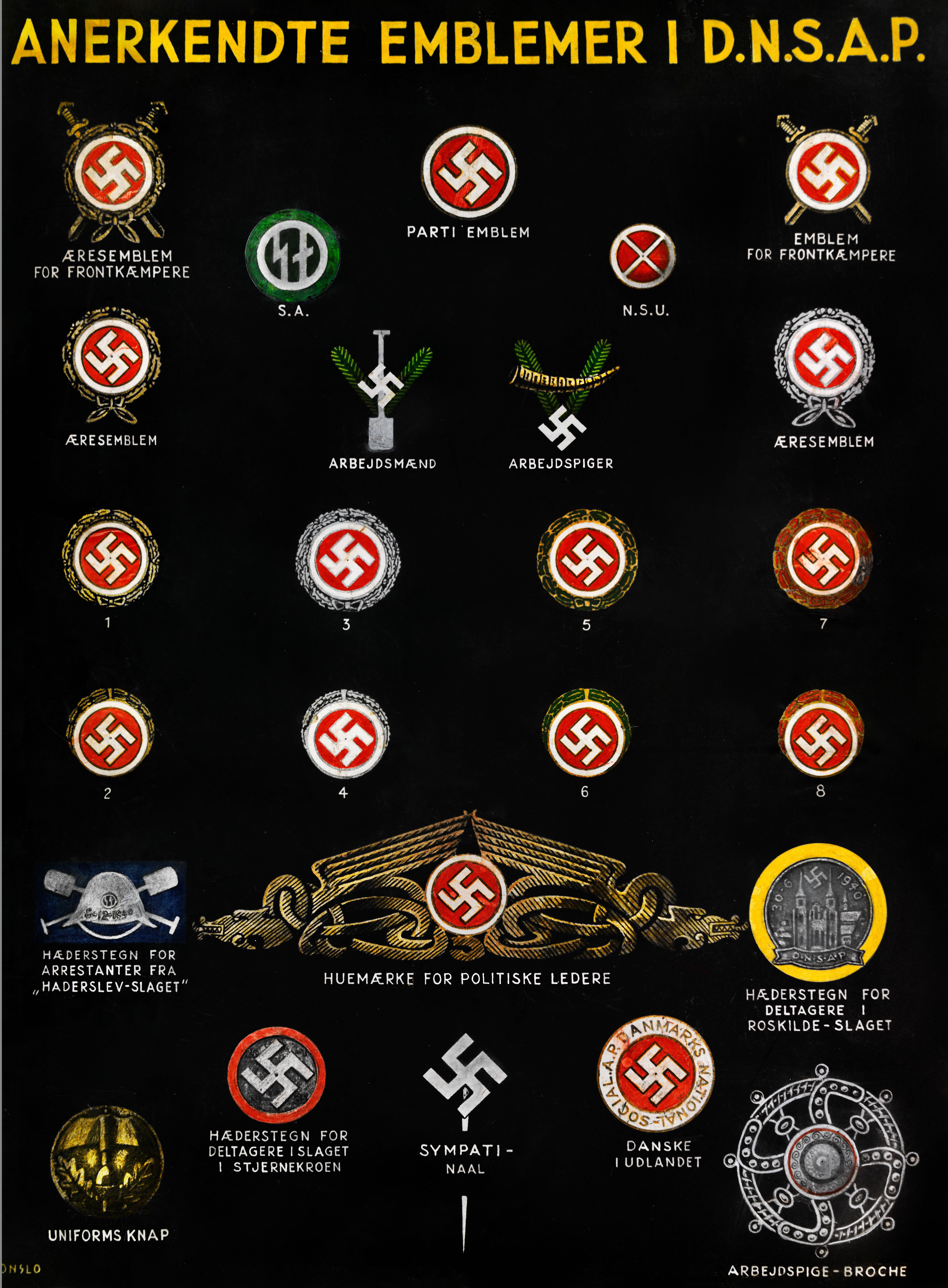
Emblems, badges and lapel pins 1942.

== See also ==
Flag/logo of the Schalburg Corps

- Christian Frederik von Schalburg
- Christian Peder Kryssing
- Danish People's Defence
- Free Corps Denmark
- Frits Clausen
- Germanic SS
- Knud Børge Martinsen
- Max Johannes Arildskov
- Military ranks of the Independent State of Croatia
- National Socialist Workers' Party of Denmark
- Non-Germans in the German armed forces during World War II
- Political decorations of the Nazi Party
- Schalburg Corps
- Waffen-SS foreign volunteers and conscripts
