= Erik Biering =

Danish businessman and diplomat

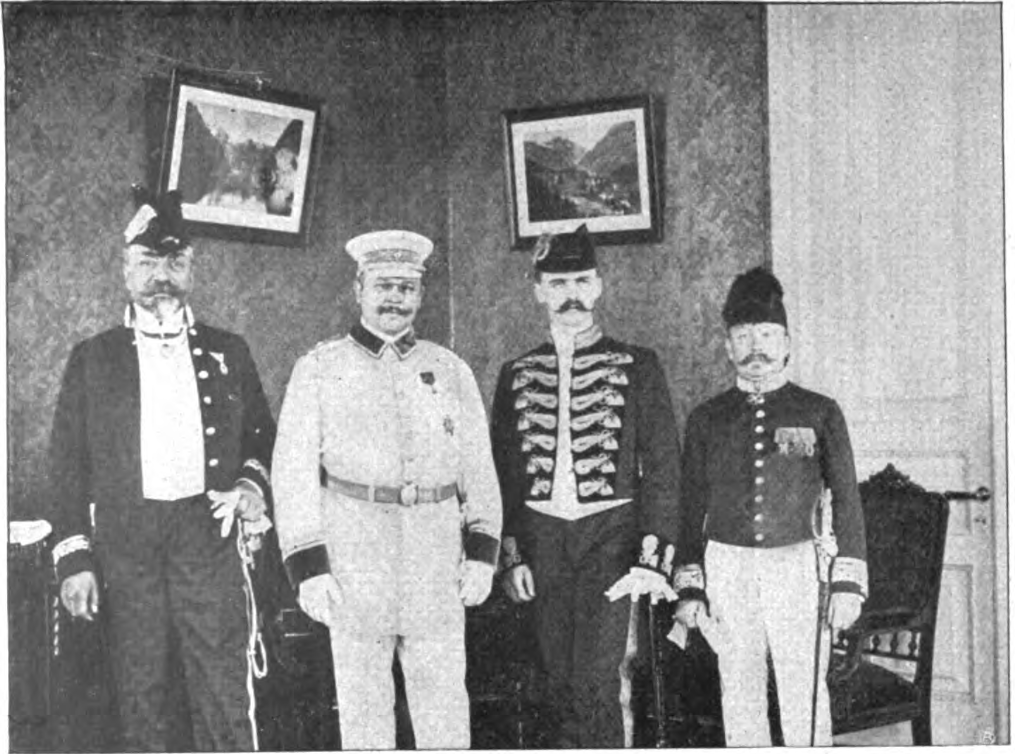
- Consuls of European nations in Baku, 1905. From left to right: Ugent Mutafow (Italy), Paul Röhll (Germany), E. F. Biering (Denmark), U.M. Feigl (Netherlands).

Vice-Consul of Denmark in Baku
- In office 1904–1908

Consul of Denmark for Caucasus
- In office 1908–1920

Consul of Denmark for Lithuania
- In office 1921–1930

Personal details
- Born: December 23, 1876 Svindinge, Svendborg County, Denmark
- Died: July 4, 1964 (aged 87) Rigshospitalet Glostrup, Denmark
- Resting place: Mariebjerg Cemetery, Gentofte, Denmark

Military service
- Branch/service: Danish Military Mission in Berlin
- Rank: Major-General

Erik Biering (born Erik Andreas Mathias Biering; 1876–1964) was a Danish businessman and diplomat.

== Early life ==
Born in Svindinge, Svendborg County in 1876 to Frederik Ferdinand Biering (1813–1879), a parish priest, and Hansine Marie Caroline Clausen (1830–1912), Biering was the youngest of 17 siblings. He passed his preliminary examination in 1893 at Svendborg Realskole and received commercial training in Denmark and Germany.

Biering later worked in Hamburg for the firm Wallsøe & Hagen, where he gained experience in concluding large contracts. He completed his military service in 1897 at the Second Lieutenant School at Kronborg Castle, and was discharged as a second lieutenant in 1899.

His half-brother Adam Gottlob Biering (1857–1914), who was 19 years his senior, had left Denmark on Erik's baptism day (25 March 1877) and eventually settled in Baku, where he became a successful drilling contractor for Nobel Brothers. A Danish traveler who visited Balakhani in 1891 described Adam as "Nobel's first drilling master" and "a small, energetic man with an unusually determined gaze, witnessing a capable personality." During a visit to Hamburg in 1900, Adam proposed that Erik join him in Baku, offering significantly better prospects than his position in Germany.

== Life in Baku ==
=== Early years and business establishment ===
Biering arrived in Baku in March 1901, traveling via Berlin, Warsaw, and Moscow. Rather than joining his brother's firm directly, he initially worked at the commission and agency firm Pollak & Co., whose Baku branch was managed by Adam's brother-in-law Karl Kulp. This arrangement allowed Erik to gain independent experience before potentially collaborating with Adam.

In December 1901, Biering borrowed 20,000 rubles from Adam and founded his own company, Biering & Raabe, together with a German partner named Raabe. The partnership proved unsuccessful and was dissolved, after which Biering established E. F. Biering & Co. in partnership with a German businessman named Walter Bernstein, a son of Aaron Bernstein. The firm supplied equipment to the oil industry on an agency and commission basis, representing foreign manufacturers of drilling equipment and machinery.

The most notable achievement of the Biering & Raabe partnership was organizing Baku's first amateur photography exhibition in spring 1903. Biering and Raabe, both keen amateur photographers, founded an association of amateur photographers and secured international contributions from photography associations in Japan and major manufacturers including Kodak and Ernemann. The exhibition, held in the Governor's Garden with premises provided free by the city of Baku and equipment loaned by Nobel Brothers, displayed approximately 2,000 photographs. The opening ceremony was attended by the Governor of Baku and blessed by the city's Orthodox provost, who noted Biering's Danish origins and his reverence for the Danish-born Empress Maria Feodorovna.

=== Acquisition of Adam's drilling enterprise ===
In 1908, Adam's health deteriorated due to kidney problems and recurring malaria. Erik negotiated with Copenhagen's Property Owners' Bank (Danish: Ejendomsbanken) to finance the purchase of Adam's drilling enterprise in Balakhani. The purchase sum was 450,000 rubles, with Erik taking out life insurance policies totaling 600,000 Danish kroner as security for the bank.

Adam's drilling enterprise was considered the third-largest contractor in the Baku oil industry, known for its exceptional quality standards. Unlike competitors such as Mukhtarov who operated up to 80 drillings simultaneously, Adam never took on more than 25 drilling towers, believing this was the maximum that could be personally supervised while maintaining first-class workmanship. The firm's main customer was Nobel Brothers, which annually awarded half of its projected drillings to contractors. During the labor unrest of 1907–1908, the Biering enterprise was prominent enough to be named by Stalin — then a revolutionary organizer in Baku — in articles criticizing oil industrialists for dismissing politically active workers.

After Adam's departure to Copenhagen in 1911, a bitter dispute arose between the brothers, involving arbitration proceedings and legal actions. However, the family at home maintained neutrality, and their mutual friends in Baku ultimately sided with Erik after hearing both brothers' accounts at a formal meeting hosted by Nobel's management. Adam died in Denmark in early 1914, having established a number of charitable foundations with his considerable fortune.

=== Telephone concession ===
In 1906, Biering learned that Baku's existing telephone system, originally granted as a concession to the city, was in poor condition and the municipality was struggling to finance improvements. Engineer Blasievski, who administered the old telephone station, suggested the concession might be acquired privately.

Biering and his partner Bernstein contacted Copenhagen, initially approaching the telephone company and then the Property Owners' Bank, which agreed to finance the venture. After intense negotiations in Saint Petersburg – where Biering secured support through the Danish legation and Great Northern Telegraph Company connections – he traveled to Tiflis in April 1907 to sign the concession agreement with the Viceroy of the Caucasus, Illarion Vorontsov-Dashkov.

The concession required constructing one of the most modern telephone installations in Russia. Chief Engineer C. E. Krarup from the Danish state telephone service was hired to design the system, with technical assistance from Copenhagen's Telephone Company. The new central station was inaugurated in spring 1910 with a major celebration attended by Baku's leading figures. The installation was later recognized by the Russian government as fulfilling all concession requirements. Biering subsequently acquired the telephone concession for Elisavetpol as well.

The Danish orientalist Arthur Christensen, who visited Baku shortly before the outbreak of World War I, described Biering as having "by his enterprise and initiative already at a young age created for himself a position as one of the magnates in the millionaire city of Baku," noting that he had "reorganized and manages... all of Baku's telephone system."

In 1914, Biering sold the drilling enterprise to a French consortium led by Bank Dreyfus (represented in Russia by the Lionosov Oil and Financing Company), receiving 1.5 million rubles. He remained as director of the expanded operation, which combined several smaller drilling firms, on condition that a joint-stock company would be formed. Biering also retained management of the telephone enterprise.

=== Other business interests ===
Beyond the drilling and telephone enterprises, Biering was co-founder, co-owner, and chairman of the board of a fishing company that held a state concession for fishing in the Kura River at its outlet into the Caspian Sea. He was also involved in the trading and industrial company "Orient," which established and operated cotton plantations in southeastern Caucasus around the Kura River, as well as silk cultivation in the mountain valleys of the Eastern Caucasus. Biering introduced Caucasian cotton to the Liverpool Exchange.

At its peak, Biering's combined enterprises employed approximately 4,000 workers. He also served as a member of the board of the Baku branch of Tiflis Commercial Bank and Baku Commercial Bank, the latter founded by the prominent Tatar philanthropist Zeinalabdin Tagiev.

=== Diplomatic career in Baku ===
In 1904, Biering was appointed Danish Vice-Consul in Baku, and in 1905 he also became Norwegian Vice-Consul following the dissolution of the union between Norway and Sweden. The Norwegian appointment came through General Director Hans Andreas Nicolai Olsen of Nobel Brothers' St. Petersburg administration, who was Norwegian by birth and married to a sister of Emanuel Nobel. Biering was elevated to Danish Consul for the Caucasus in 1908, with direct reporting authority to the Foreign Ministry in Copenhagen rather than through the legation in St. Petersburg. The consulate operated from the telephone company building at Birzhevaya 32 (now Zarifa Aliyeva Street 77, which houses the Ministry of Digital Development and Transportation of Azerbaijan).

As consul, Biering navigated the complex political situation during World War I and the Russian Revolution. When the first Bolshevik government in Baku attempted to nationalize the telephone enterprise in 1918, Biering convened the consular corps and successfully invoked an old Danish-Russian commercial treaty that protected Danish citizens' property during wars and uprisings. The protest, signed by consuls from Belgium, Denmark, England, France, Greece, Holland, Norway, and Sweden, halted the nationalization attempt.

=== March Days (1918) ===
Biering was an eyewitness to the March Days massacre of 1918. The violence erupted on the evening of March 18, when Bolshevik forces attempted to disarm a group of armed Tatars at the harbor who were returning from the funeral of Tagiev's son in Lankaran. As fighting spread through the city, Biering rushed to the telephone station, which had been occupied by Bolshevik soldiers under a Latvian officer named Berg. Biering confronted Berg and demanded the removal of soldiers from the operations hall, threatening to abandon responsibility for the station; Berg complied, and Biering managed to keep telephone services running throughout the crisis. The civil war raged for two days and two nights, with the Bolshevik fleet bombarding the city and fires breaking out across Baku. Biering personally witnessed atrocities, including the stabbing of a mullah by Armenian assailants on his street. He also observed Armenian youths photograph a murdered Persian worker and later saw the image published in a German newspaper with the caption claiming it showed Armenians murdered by Tatars – an example of wartime propaganda that outraged him. The fighting ended with the defeat of the Muslim forces; wealthy Tatars fled to the mountains, and a Bolshevik-Armenian council government was established under Stepan Shaumian.

=== Turkish siege and capture of Baku (1918) ===
During the Turkish siege of Baku from mid-July to September 15, 1918, Biering played a significant diplomatic role. The siege pitted approximately 20,000 Turkish regular troops under Nuri Pasha against a poorly disciplined defending force of some 30,000–40,000 soldiers, primarily war-weary Armenians returning from the dissolved Russian front.

As the situation became desperate, Biering was approached by the provisional dictatorship and Armenian National Council to participate in surrender negotiations. Together with the Persian and Swedish consuls, he established formal protocols for neutral mediation. On September 15, 1918, as Turkish artillery bombarded the city, Biering personally led a delegation to the Turkish lines, traveling under a white flag fashioned from a child's bedsheet.

Meeting with General Mursel Pasha at Turkish headquarters in the cemetery outside Baku, Biering spoke in German and secured promises to protect the lives and property of all inhabitants "without distinction in their nationality." General Nuri Pasha subsequently issued a proclamation guaranteeing civilian safety. However, these promises were broken: following the city's capture, Turkish irregular forces and Muslim volunteers conducted three days of massacres and looting primarily targeting the Armenian population.

During the violence, Biering sheltered numerous Armenian refugees in the telephone building, including Bishop Bagrat and other clergy. This account is independently corroborated by Arthur Lessner, Nobel Brothers' chief manager in Baku, who recorded that he "went on to Biering, whose apartment was full of Armenians with their clergy at the head" and stayed overnight there as the shooting intensified. On September 18, 1918, Biering drafted a formal protest to Nuri Pasha on behalf of the neutral consuls (Danish, Persian, Dutch, and Swedish), condemning the "systematic atrocities and looting" and reminding the commander of his broken promises. This protest later contributed to General Mursal Pasha's arrest and court-martial by British authorities after the Turkish evacuation.

=== Community leadership ===
Beyond his business and diplomatic activities, Biering served as chairman of the Evangelical Lutheran Church and school board in Baku from 1911 to 1920. This position gave him responsibility for the German-speaking Protestant community, which numbered approximately 7,000–8,000 members, mostly descendants of German artisans who had lived in Russia for generations.

Biering was also active in the Nordic Charitable Association (Danish: den nordiske Velgørenhedsforening), a social organization for Scandinavians and Finns in Baku. The association — called "Nordic" rather than "Scandinavian" to include Finns, and "Charitable" to avoid appearing political under Russian law — comprised approximately 50 Finns, 40 Swedes, and 10 Danes, with no Norwegians. Meetings were held at Nobel Brothers' clubhouse in Balakhani, where members gathered for festivals featuring Scandinavian flags, national anthems, speeches, dancing, and Swedish punch. Christensen, who attended one such festival as the Bierings' guest, noted that Biering gave one of only two Danish speeches that evening and praised his "overflowing kindness and thoughtful helpfulness" in assisting visiting compatriots with introductions, transportation, and navigating Russian bureaucracy. Among the more colorful visitors Biering assisted was the Faroese explorer Sigert Patursson, brother of the kongsbóndi Jóannes Patursson, who arrived in Baku around 1917 without hat or passport, having traveled extensively in Persia and Russia; he claimed support from the chancellery of Empress Maria Feodorovna for plans to establish an ornithological museum in Kislovodsk. Biering was also known for his philanthropy; in 1910, together with Nobel director Wilhelm Hagelin, he funded a young man's singing studies in Berlin.

Several capable Danes worked in leading positions in Biering's enterprises. Engineer Oscar Jacobsen served as technical chief of the telephone company from 1907 to 1912, then transferred to the oil industry as an engineer in Biering's contractor business. After a one-year study trip to the United States to learn American drilling methods, Jacobsen became chief of one of the largest contractor firms in Baku until the Revolution. Jacobsen's successor as technical chief of the telephone company was civil engineer Axel C. G. Petersen, who held the post for two years before returning to Denmark, where he became known as co-owner of Electrical Fono Film together with civil engineer Arnold Poulsen.

Svend Langmack, Biering's brother-in-law, served as director of the Orient company until the Revolution; he later emigrated to the United States and died in Washington, D.C. in 1942.

=== Departure from the Caucasus ===
In 1919, Biering traveled to Tiflis with telephone equipment, hoping to resume operations in Baku after the situation stabilized. However, according to him the Bolsheviks broke their promises and invaded Azerbaijan in early 1920, establishing Cheka rule. His nephew Christian Biering was arrested but was released through Biering's negotiations with a Bolshevik representative; after spending three months in prison, he was exchanged for telephone equipment.

Recognizing that his existence in the Caucasus had become impossible, Biering returned to Denmark in 1921 with his remaining staff. The Soviet Russian government continued operating his former enterprises. Before departing, he performed one final service for the Nobel family: he delivered a case containing Mrs. Nobel's jewelry, which had been buried in the garden of Villa Petrolia in Baku since the Revolution began.

== Later years ==
Upon reporting to the Danish Foreign Ministry, Foreign Minister Harald Scavenius immediately offered Biering several diplomatic posts. Biering insisted on remaining close to Russia, hoping the Bolshevik government would prove unstable and he might recover his investments. Scavenius offered Kaunas in Lithuania, which Biering initially dismissed as "just a small old Russian fortress." After a week's consideration and confirming it was habitable for his family, he accepted.

On 1 June 1921, he was appointed Danish consul in Kaunas, Lithuania, from 1923 with the title of Consul General, and in 1925 also as Chargé d'Affaires. In Kaunas, Biering became a respected figure in the small diplomatic community; the diary of American consul Robert W. Heingartner records that Biering "managed to greet the Soviet minister cordially" at diplomatic receptions despite having lost everything to the Bolsheviks, noting that "all of Mr. Biering's business interests and property were confiscated" and that he had "accumulated a considerable fortune" during his years in Russia. From the outset, Biering performed both consular and diplomatic representative functions — a dual role that Lithuanian officials later cited as a model of efficient diplomatic practice worth emulating. The consulate was established in a rented building on Vytauto Avenue, and included an agricultural department headed by Carl Andreas Koefoed, the Danish agrarian expert who had played a key role in the Stolypin agrarian reforms in Russia. Biering and Koefoed had known each other from their years in Russia and remained close friends, often discussing their experiences there. He remained there for nine years, finding "a brilliant field of work" for his experience. A notable reunion occurred when he discovered that the Lithuanian traffic minister was the same Russian official who had nearly blocked his telephone concession campaign in St. Petersburg years earlier — Benediktas Tomaševičius; this led to significant Danish engineering contracts worth approximately 20 million Danish kroner through the firm Højgaard & Schultz.

=== Envoy to the Balkans (1930–1947) ===
In 1930, Biering was appointed Danish envoy to Yugoslavia, Romania, and Bulgaria, initially residing in Belgrade. In 1933, he moved his residence to Bucharest, where the Danish consulate had previously operated under Consul General Hans Holger Dithmer. Following the assassination of Ion G. Duca on 29 December 1933, Biering joined his Scandinavian colleagues — the ministers of Norway and Estonia — in sending official condolences to the Romanian government.

Biering actively promoted Danish-Romanian cultural relations. In December 1936, he supported the first official exhibition of Danish art in Romania, held at the Toma Stelian Museum in Bucharest from 5 December 1936 to 18 January 1937. Organized by art historian G. Oprescu, the exhibition featured Danish painting and sculpture. At a press conference before the opening, Biering expressed his hope that "this first official exhibition of Danish art will be seen and understood by your compatriots, not only by artists, but also by the general public, for only in this way can we achieve the goal we have pursued — of getting to know each other reciprocally and thereby developing the friendship between Denmark and Romania."

==== World War II ====
Following the German occupation of Denmark in April 1940, Biering continued to represent Denmark in Bucharest under difficult circumstances. When a devastating earthquake struck Romania on 10 November 1940, killing over 1,000 people, Biering presented official condolences to Ion Antonescu's government on behalf of Denmark.

Throughout the war years, Biering maintained an active diplomatic presence, regularly attending audiences with Deputy Prime Minister Mihai Antonescu and participating in the social functions of Bucharest's diplomatic corps. At the New Year's reception at the Royal Palace on 1 January 1942, Biering was listed second in order of precedence among the diplomats present, immediately after the Papal Nuncio Andrea Cassulo, who served as Dean of the Diplomatic Corps.

As Denmark's envoy, Biering navigated a complex position — representing an occupied nation while stationed in an Axis-allied country. He and his wife Sigrid were prominent figures in wartime Bucharest society, attending events hosted by both neutral and Axis-aligned legations. At a gala film screening organized by the Finnish Legation in May 1942, attended by King Michael I, Mrs. Biering was seated directly beside the young king, with her husband next to her — indicating the couple's high standing in the diplomatic hierarchy. Mrs. Biering also attended social events such as the Italian fashion show at the Romanian Athenaeum in April 1942, alongside Mrs. Marie Antonescu, wife of the Romanian dictator.

On 7 May 1944, during Allied bombing raids on Bucharest, the Danish legation was struck and partially destroyed by fire. Biering lost many personal papers and two paintings by the Danish landscape painter Viggo Langer in the blaze.

==== Post-war transition ====
Biering remained at his post in Bucharest after Romania's switch to the Allied side in August 1944 and through the subsequent Soviet occupation. He continued serving as Danish minister during the turbulent transition to communist rule, navigating the new political realities imposed by the Soviet-backed government. In 1946, under pressure from the Romanian authorities, Biering was compelled to refuse a visa request from a Danish resident seeking to leave the country.

Six months after reaching the mandatory retirement age on 1 January 1947, Biering was reassigned. On 1 July 1947, he was appointed head of the Danish military mission in Berlin with the rank of Major General.

During negotiations with the Allies, particularly the Russian occupation authorities, his knowledge of the Russian language and mentality proved highly valuable, contributing to his strong position. While in Berlin, Biering wrote an obituary for his old friend Carl Andreas Koefoed, who died in 1948; in it, Biering reflected on Koefoed's "gigantic plan for the consolidation of the Russian peasant class" and speculated that if Russia had implemented such reforms twenty years earlier, "much would look different today." He stepped down on 15 June 1949, after which he was tasked with a special mission to alleviate the refugee pressure in South Schleswig. Through an agreement with the state government in Kiel, he facilitated the relocation of approximately 20,000 refugees to other parts of Germany. In May 1950, he left the foreign service. He died on 4 July 1964.

== Family ==
He was married to Sigrid Sjöwall (15 January 1883 – 8 August 1960) on 11 October 1904 (28 September by the Russian calendar) in the Evangelical Lutheran Church in Baku. The ceremony was performed by Pastor Zimmermann. The couple had become engaged on 27 December 1903 during an outing on horseback over the steppes around Balakhani.

Her father, Per Sjöwall (1856–1933), was department head at Nobel's industrial area in Balakhani, eventually becoming chief of the entire operation. The Biering home, together with the Nobel chiefs' homes, became a gathering place for all Scandinavians residing in Baku and Balakhani.

They had three children:

- Svend (born 3 September 1905 in Berlin)
- Inger (born 26 November 1907)
- Gunnar (born September 1911)

== Awards ==
=== Danish awards ===
- Knight of the Order of Dannebrog, 1910
- Dannebrog's Medal of Honor, 1924
- Commander 2nd Degree of the Order of Dannebrog, 1934
- Commander 1st Degree of the Order of Dannebrog, 1942
- Grand Cross of the Order of Dannebrog, 1949

=== Foreign awards ===
- Order of Civil Merit (Bulgaria), 1st Class
- Order of the Yugoslav Crown, 1st Class
- Order of St. Sava, 1st Class
- Order of Gediminas, 1st Class
- Order of St. Olav, 3rd Class
- Red Cross Medal (Prussia), 2nd and 3rd Class
- Order of the Star, 3rd Class
- Order of the Crown, 1st Class
- Order of the Star of Romania, 1st Class
- Austrian Decoration of the Red Cross
- Order of the Falcon
- Order of Orange-Nassau, Commander (27 September 1929)

During the Turkish occupation of Baku in 1918, General Nuri Pasha offered Biering a Turkish decoration for facilitating the establishment of peace and order, which Biering declined.

== Works ==
- My twenty years in the Caucasus (Danish: Mine tyve aar i Kaukasus), Munksgaard, 1960
