= Kofoed =

Kofoed is a Danish surname. It can also be spelled Kofod, Koefod, or Koefoed. The surname is commonly associated with the island of Bornholm, where it is most common.

== People ==
- Alexandra Koefoed, Norwegian sailor
- Bart Kofoed, American basketball player
- Carl Andreas Koefoed, Danish agronomist
- Charlotte Koefoed, Danish rower
- Einar Laurentius Koefoed, Norwegian marine scientist
- Erik Kofoed-Hansen, Danish fencer
- Flemming Kofod-Svendsen, Danish minister and politician
- Frances Mary Kofod, Australian linguist
- Hans Jespersen Koefoed, Danish painter
- Holger Koefoed, Norwegian art historian
- Jens Christian Kofoed, Danish architect
- Jeppe Kofod, Danish politician
- Kristian Hansen Kofoed, Danish civil servant and politician
- Magnus Kofod Andersen, Danish football player
- Peder Kofod Ancher, Danish jurist
- Peter Koefoed, Danish field hockey player
- Peter Koefoed (politician), Danish politician
- Rasmus Kofoed, Danish chef
- Rasmus Kofoed, Danish cricketer
- Rigmor Kofoed-Larsen, Norwegian politician
- Sofia Anker-Kofoed, Swedish footballer
- Tomas Kofod, Danish actor

== Other ==
- Kofoeds School, a social pedagogical school in Copenhagen, Denmark
