= Bovrup-kartoteket =

Bovrup-kartoteket ("The Bovrup File") is a partial transcript of the member file of the National Socialist Workers' Party of Denmark (Danish: Danmarks Nationalsocialistiske Arbejderparti; DNSAP) created in 1945 by Danish resistance members and published as a book in 1946. The transcript is named after Bovrup, the hometown of DNSAP's leader Frits Clausen who created the actual DNSAP member file. The transcript is incomplete with 22,795 entries, while the actual DNSAP member file had 50,000 entries.

The year the Bovrup File was published, the court of Copenhagen classified the file leaving only historians with access to it.

In November 2018 an association of Danish genealogists published the subset of 5,265 entries for members born in 1908 or before, i.e. at least 110 years ago.

== Prominent DNSAP members found in the Bovrup File ==
| Family name, first name | DOB | Title | Address | Membership start | Bovrup page | Bovrup number |
|---|---|---|---|---|---|---|
| Arhoff, Chr. | 7 February 1893 | Actor | Copenhagen, Duevej 3 | 14 February 1941 | 11 | 498 |
| Bergstedt, Harald Bergstedt | 10 August 1877 | Writer | Copenhagen, Høgholtvej 16 | 10 December 1942 | 13 | 660 |
| Bonnén, Folmer | 17 December 1885 | Painter | Bagsværd, Gl. Mosevej | 1 April 1940 | 308 | 16423 |
| Bregnø, Jens Jacob | 9 February 1890 | Sculptor | København, Haraldsg. 18. | 28 August 1940 | 17 | 840 |
| Clausen, Fritz | 12 November 1893 | Veterinarian | Bovrup | 9 March 1931 | 322 | 17123 |
| Knuth, Frederik Marcus | 5 May 1904 | Count | Knuthenborg pr. Bandholm | 19??-04-22 | 370 | 19410 |
| Meincke, Carl Viggo | 8 March 1902 | Author | København, Jensløvsvej 6 | 14 October 1940 | 107 | 5341 |
| Mikines, Sámal Joensen | 23 February 1906 | Painter | København, Store Kongensgade 95-1 | 1 August 1940 | 109 | 5408 |
| Schalburg, C.F. von | 15 April 1906 | Captain (armed forces) | København, Brøndsteds Alle 6 | 1939 | 150 | 7514 |
