= Tyrihans =

Norwegian satirical magazine

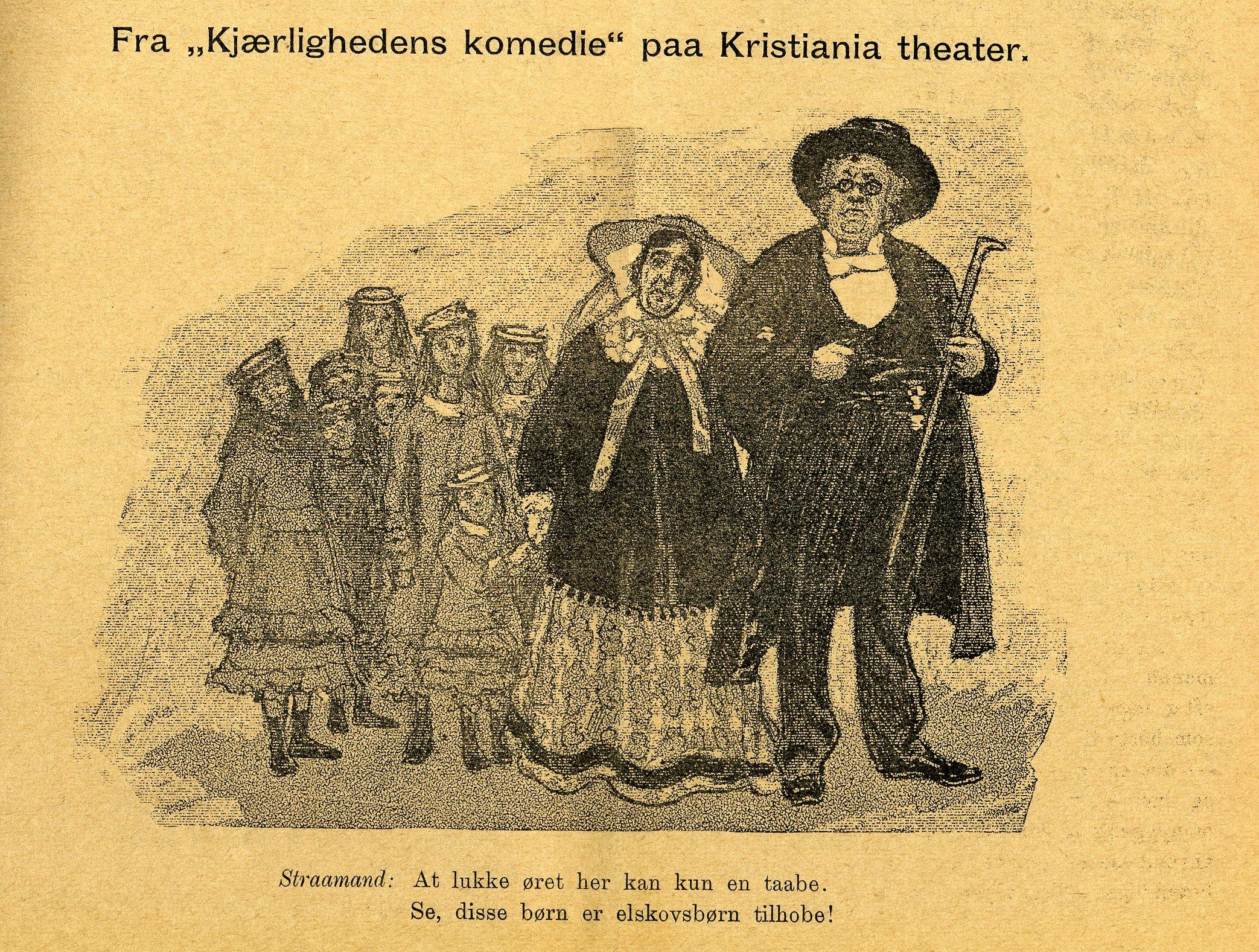
Illustration to Love's Comedy in Tyrihans No. 22 c. 31 May 1895

Tyrihans was a Norwegian satirical magazine.

It existed between 1892 and 1904, and was published out of Kristiania. Among its staff were Axel Maurer (editor), Olaf Gulbransson, Andreas Bloch and Ragnvald Blix.
