= Niels Peter Bolt =

Danish painter

Niels Peter Bolt (1886–1965) was a Danish painter. After studying under Johan Rohde at Kunstnernes Frie Studieskoler, he became a member of De Tretten where he exhibited in 1909 and 1912. His work is characterized by metallic hues and a flamboyant style. His approach is best represented by his colourful pastels of large bouquets. Bolt also held solo exhibitions in 1913 and 1928 and exhibited at Charlottenborg from 1916 to 1939.
