= Max Johannes Arildskov =

Danish Nazi collaborator

- Born: 17 February 1896; Havndal, Randers Municipality, Denmark
- Died: 1986 (aged 89–90)

Max Johannes Arildskov (17 February 1896 – 1986) was a Danish Nazi political activist and collaborator prior to and during World War II.

== Biography ==
In 1919, he met with his father to the Estonian Independence War, where he advanced to Lieutenant in the Danish-Baltic Auxiliary Corps. The corps contract expired, and most of them had returned to Denmark at the end of August 1919, [1] but some veterans Arildskov joined the Swedish Legion, a part of Admiral Alexander Koltsjak's Russian Northwest Army under General Nikolai Yudenich. The Northwest Army consisted of Zaren's life kosaks and other "white" Russians, a worn and ill-equipped army who attacked Petrograd in October 1919. A battle that became a strategically important victory for the Bolsheviks.

In 1932 he met Frits Clausen and joined his political grouping National Socialist Workers' Party of Denmark (DNSAP). He quickly advanced through the ranks, first as district leader, later member of the party staff and eventually became a candidate for the parliamentary elections in 1943. When DNSAP lost the election he blamed Fritz Clausen for his failures. On 5 May he started his own party, New Denmark (Danish: Nye Danmark), and on 4 June he was excluded from DNSAP.

In October 1943, he co-founded the Schalburg Corps in collaboration with the Danish People's Defence. Later he contributed to the creation of the Swedish Landstorm, a paramilitary militia, who reached the size of about 200 people. On 9 January 1944 he became commander of this militia.

In July 1944, he dismantled the Schalburg Corps together with the corps administrator Jens Peter Krandrup.

After the war he was arrested, and after a trial was sentenced to eight years in prison. However he was pardoned on 9 May 1948.

He died in 1986.
