= Ragnvald Blix =

Norwegian illustrator, caricaturist and magazine editor

Ragnvald Blix (12 September 1882 – 2 May 1958) was a Norwegian illustrator, caricaturist and magazine editor. He was particularly known for his anti-Nazi drawings during World War II.

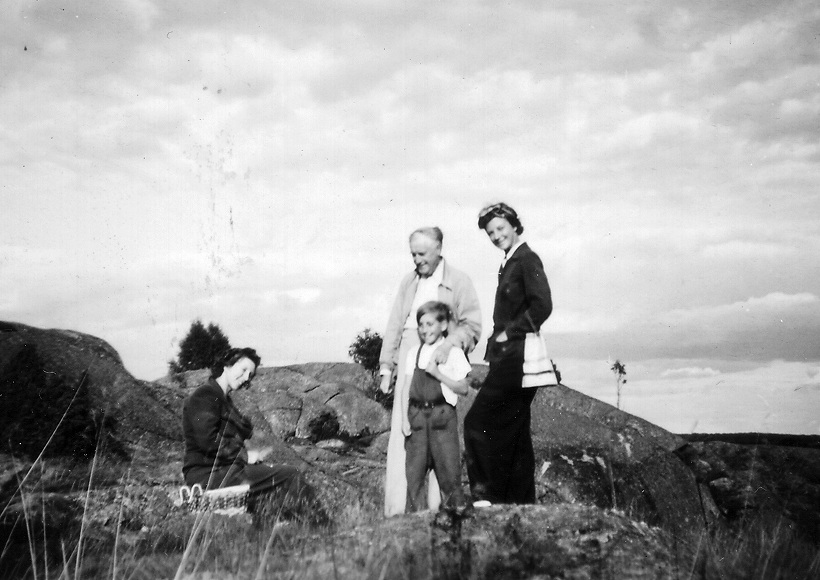

Ragnvald Blix was born in Oslo, the son of minister Elias Blix (1835–1902). Blix was editor of the satirical magazine Tyrihans in 1901. He worked for the Paris newspaper Le Journal from 1904. He delivered illustrations to the Munich magazine Simplicissimus from 1908 to 1918, and edited the satirical magazine Exlex from 1919 to 1920. During World War II he was known for his satirical drawings in the Swedish anti-Nazi newspaper Göteborgs Handels- och Sjöfartstidning, under the signature "Stig Höök". His war drawings were published in the collections Stig Höök 1942–44 (1944) and De fem årene (1945).
