= De Tretten =

Danish artist group

De Tretten (The Group of Thirteen), also De Tretten Kunstnere (The Thirteen Artists), was a grouping of young Danish artists who arranged their own exhibitions in Copenhagen from 1909 to 1912 in order to display works which would not have been accepted for exhibition by the then rather traditional Royal Danish Academy of Fine Arts.

== Background ==
Based on the French model of the Salon des Refusés, De Tretten was founded on the initiative of Olaf Rude (who exhibited there in 1909 and 1910) and the critic Jens Pedersen. Rude had managed to obtain financial guarantees for the enterprise from those who had recently established themselves in the seaside resort of Marielyst on Falster which had been promoted as an artists colony along the lines of Skagen. Several, including Rude himself, had studied at the Kunstnernes Frie Studieskoler under Kristian Zahrtmann who had broken away from the Academy into the developing trends of Naturalism and Realism. Paintings exhibited at De Tretten were often in line with movements of the times such as Futurism and Post-Impressionism.

== Exhibiting artists ==
De Tretten also included:

- Folmer Bonnén (1885–1960), exhibited in 1909, 1910 and 1912
- Niels Peter Bolt (1886-1965), exhibited in 1909 and 1912
- Anton Hansen (1891–1960), exhibited in 1910 and 1912
- Harald Henriksen (1883–1960), exhibited in 1909 and 1910
- Axel P. Jensen (1886–1972), exhibited in 1909 and 1910
- Carl Jensen (1887–1961), exhibited in 1909 and 1910
- Aksel Jørgensen (1883-1957), exhibited in 1909 and 1910
- Hans Jespersen Koefoed (1884–1975), exhibited in 1912
- Jais Nielsen (1885–1961), exhibited in 1909 and 1910
- Storm Petersen (1882–1949), better known as Storm P., exhibited in 1909
- William Scharff (1886–1959), exhibited in 1909 and 1910
- Einar Utzon-Frank (1888–1955), exhibited in 1909
- Edvard Weie (1879-1943), exhibited in 1909.

== Similar Danish initiatives ==
De Tretten was not the only attempt to exhibit outside the Academy. Den Frie Udstilling (The Free Exhibition) was established in 1891 and continues to exhibit today. Grønningen, founded in 1915, now exhibits in the Charlottenborg Exhibition Hall.

== Bibliography ==
- Katalog over de tretten Kunstneres Udstilling, Copenhagen: Den Frie Udstillings Bygning, 1909-1912.
