= Axel Maurer =

Norwegian stagewriter, editor and theatre director

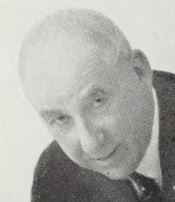
Axel Maurer.

Axel Maurer (12 April 1866 – 26 September 1925) was a Norwegian stagewriter, editor and theatre director.

He was born in Kristiania. He took the law degree cand.jur. in 1889, but did not practise as a lawyer, as he instead traveled abroad to study theatre. From 1895 to 1896 he was the artistic and financial director of the Karl Johan Theatre in Kristiania. This theatre had been established in 1893 in the premises of Kristiania Tivoli, and led by Olaf Hansson before Maurer took over, but it went defunct in 1896. During this period he wrote and issued the play Lykkens Pamphilius, which was staged at Sekondteatret in 1900 to mediocre reviews. The same reception happened to his next play, Kundskabens Træ, staged in November 1897 at Christiania Theatre. His play Babylons konge, staged at Nationaltheatret, received somewhat more mixed reviews. Another play, Arilda, was accepted by Nationaltheatret, but probably never staged.

Maurer edited the humorous magazine Tyrihans from 1898 to 1899. His songbook Kristiania-viser, issued in 1906 with new lyrics to known melodies, was received well. He also embarked on recitation tours in Norway as well as in Denmark (1909), the US (1910) and Germany (1911). In 1917 he issued the novel Den store kjærlighed, and the humoresques Portnøklen and Mindebægeret in 1918 and 1919 respectively.

Maurer was not uncontroversial. In 1905, when Norway was about to dissolve the union with Sweden, he attacked the Negotiations in Karlstad in a leaflet which was sold on the street. The leaflet was soon forbidden by the Norwegian authorities, who did not want a critical viewpoint on the negotiations, according to the diaries of Johan Castberg. In 1915 Maurer attended the general assembly of Nationaltheatret. In the open discussion at the assembly, he denounced the presence of a "camorra" in Norwegian art and literature, which acted as a "secret society". The "camorra" had a secret influence over which plays were staged, and which artists that received grants. The purported "chairman" of this "camorra" was theatre critic Sigurd Bødtker. A debate was called in Kunstforeningen, where Maurer was asked to back his allegations up. During the debate it was pointed to a work by Axel Borge, which had supposedly been refused under murky circumstances, but Borge himself appeared to deny this and support Bødtker. Bødtker denied the claim of a camorra, and stated that the probable reason for the attack was the refusal of one of Maurer's plays. Maurer was strongly attacked by Nils Kjær, and also received unfavourable comments from Peter Egge, Hjalmar Christensen and Arnulf Øverland.

He died in 1925, only 59 years old. A street in Oslo, Axel Maurers vei, was named after him in 1934.
