= Eizhen Berg =

Latvian Bolshevik revolutionary and one of the 26 Baku Commissars

- Eižens Bergs
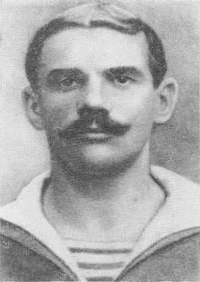
- Born: 1892; Riga, Livonian Governorate, Russian Empire
- Died: September 20, 1918 (aged 25–26); Krasnovodsk, Russian SFSR (now Türkmenbaşy, Turkmenistan)
- Other name: Эйжен Августович Берг
- Organization: RSDLP(b)
- Known for: 26 Baku Commissars

Eizhen Berg (Latvian: Eižens Bergs; Russian: Эйжен Августович Берг, Eizhen Avgustovich Berg; 1892 – 20 September 1918) was a Latvian Bolshevik revolutionary, sailor, and one of the 26 Baku Commissars executed during the Russian Civil War.

== Early life ==
Bergs was born in Riga into a fisherman's family. He trained as a metalworker. During the Russian Revolution of 1905, he served as a fighter in a workers' militia (druzhina).

== Political activity ==
During World War I, Bergs served as a machinist aboard the battleship Sevastopol in the Baltic Fleet. He joined the Bolshevik Party in 1917.

Following the February Revolution, Bergs became one of the organizers and leaders of the Bolshevik organization on his ship. He was elected to the Tsentrobalt (Central Committee of the Baltic Fleet) in its first and third convocations, and also served on the Tsentroflot (Central Committee of the Navy). In July 1917, he was arrested by the Provisional Government.

=== October Revolution ===
During the October Revolution, Bergs commanded a detachment of sailors from the 2nd Baltic Fleet Crew during the storming of the Winter Palace. He served as a member of the Naval Revolutionary Military Committee.

On Lenin's orders, Bergs joined Anatoly Zheleznyakov and Nikolai Khovrin in leading a detachment of Baltic sailors sent to Moscow to support the Bolshevik forces there. He subsequently served as commissar of the staff of a naval detachment that fought near Belgorod, Kharkiv, and Chuhuiv.

=== Baku (1918) ===
In the summer of 1918, Bergs was sent together with V. Polukhin to the Caspian Flotilla, where he worked to strengthen the combat readiness of ships on the Baku roadstead. From July 1918, he served as a member of the Revolutionary Military Committee and as head of communications (nachalnik svyazi) for the Caucasian Red Army.

During the March Days massacre of 1918, Bergs commanded Bolshevik soldiers who occupied the Baku telephone station. According to the memoirs of Danish consul Erik Biering, who owned the telephone concession, Bergs was "a Latvian officer" who had placed soldiers throughout the building. Biering confronted Bergs and demanded the removal of soldiers from the operations hall, threatening to abandon responsibility for the station if they remained. Bergs complied with the request, and Biering was able to keep telephone services running throughout the crisis.

== Execution ==
After the fall of Baku to Turkish and Azerbaijani forces in September 1918, Bergs was arrested along with other Bolshevik leaders. He was executed on 20 September 1918 as one of the 26 Baku Commissars, shot at the 207th verst of the Trans-Caspian Railway between the stations of Akhcha-Kuyma and Pereval (now in Balkan Region, Turkmenistan).

== Legacy ==
In 1965, the 5th Bailov Street in Baku was renamed in Bergs' honor. The street has since been renamed Ali Nazmi Street. A Soviet oil tanker named after Bergs was launched in 1971 and decommissioned in 2000.

The 26 Baku Commissars were buried at the Hovsan cemetery in Baku, where a monument was erected in their memory.

== See also ==
- 26 Baku Commissars
- March Days
- Battle of Baku
- Baku Commune
