= Harald Henriksen =

Danish painter

Harald Nikolaj Kampmann Henriksen (1883–1960) was a Danish painter whose landscapes combine a rather traditional style with the new trends in French painting.

== Biography ==
Born in Odense, he first worked in a Copenhagen bank (1903–1911) before turning to art, befriending Olaf Rude, Jens Pedersen and the other artists who together organized alternative exhibitions as De Tretten. Initially influenced by L.A. Ring, he studied under Rude, working with him in Lolland (1911) and Funen (1914). Henriksen's watercolours combine a traditional approach with the more modern trends he had learnt from his experience of French art. For many years, he lived near Frederiksberg Park, a romantic area combining the city's urban surroundings with the open look of the countryside. It inspired many of his paintings.

Henriksen also designed costumes for the Royal Danish Theatre (1915–1923) and decorated pottery for Royal Copenhagen (1912–1930).

The critic Klaus Rifbjerg has difficulty in placing Harald Henriksen in Danish art but comments, "Seeing his pictures is like looking at yourself and at the paths you have walked: changing, delightful, icy-cold, windy, Danish, making you feel both moved and thankful."

== Exhibitions ==
- De Tretten 1909 (som gæst)
- Kunstnernes Efterårsudstilling: 1913-1916
- De Syv, in Grønningen's Indianerhytten, 1916
- Charlottenborg's Spring Exhibition: 1916-1960 (except 1947 and 1953)
- Charlottenborg's Autumn Exhibition: 1922, 1928, 1937, 1943–47, 1949
- Grafisk kunstnersamfund: 1917-18, 1931, 1937, 1952–58, 1960
- Nordisk Grafisk Union: London 1938

Solo exhibitions

- Fru Vige & Co., Copenhagen, 1920.
- Kunstboden, Copenhagen, 1923.
- Kunstsalen, Copenhagen, 1923, 1938, 1942.
- Ramme-Larsen Copenhagen, 1935.
- Bachs Kunsthandel, Copenhagen, 1960

== Literature ==
- Lindboe, Ole (2008). Naturens spejl: maleren Harald Henriksen (in Danish). Thaning & Appel. ISBN 978-87-413-0096-2.
