= Anton Hansen =

Danish cartoonist and painter

Anton Hansen (1891–1960) was a Danish cartoonist and painter. Like Storm P. and Aksel Jørgensen, he illustrated local newspapers with satirical sketches, especially of Copenhagen's poor. He had met both as a member of De Tretten where he exhibited in 1910 and 1912.

Hansen contributed a number of politically satirical cartoons to the Danish Ekstra Bladet and the Norwegian Exlex ans Arbeiderbladet between 1909 and 1924. He worked for the German Simplicissimus (1920–1932) and later draw cartoons for Danish newspapers including Socialdemokraten and Information. He also made artistic drawings of the city and imaginative illustrations for books such as Grimms Eventyr (Grimms' Fairy Tales).

== Literature ==
- Hanne Abildgaard, Anton Hansen – Mellemkrigstidens sorte satiriker, Arbejdermuseet, 2001. ISBN 87-88626-24-5.
