= Adolf Hallman =

Swedish illustrator

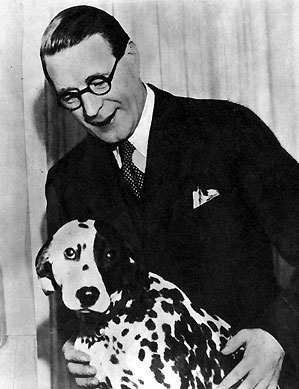
- Born: 1 March 1893; Gothenburg
- Died: 3 January 1968 (aged 74); Rome, Italy
- Occupation: Illustrator

Adolf Hallman (1 March 1893 – 3 January 1968) was a Swedish illustrator who contributed to Swedish, Danish and Norwegian newspapers and magazines, including Tidens Tegn, Dagbladet, Exlex and Politiken. Among his books is På Boulevard Europa. He illustrated editions of Charles Baudelaire's book Fleurs du Mal and Guy de Maupassant's book Boule de Suif.
