= Exlex =

Norwegian satirical magazine

Exlex is a former Norwegian weekly satirical magazine, published from 1919 to 1920. It was edited by illustrator Ragnvald Blix. Other contributors were illustrators Olaf Gulbransson, Anton Hansen, Adolf Hallman, Ossian Elgström and Robert Storm Petersen, and the poet Herman Wildenvey.

A total of ninety-six issues were published between February 1919 and December 1920.
