= Folmer Bonnén =

Danish artist

Folmer Bonnén (17 February 1885 – 10 October 1960) was a Danish painter and journalist. He was one of the founding members of the grouping of modern artists known as De Tretten where, in 1909, he exhibited a large colourful painting Ungdom i aftensol (Youth in the Evening Sun), causing quite a stir. Kristian Zahrtmann immediately supported the daring work, rewarding Bonnén with a stipendium. His work was part of the painting event in the art competition at the 1924 Summer Olympics.

As can be seen from his solo exhibition in 1942, Bonnén's later paintings were much more subdued as, no doubt under the influence of the Nazis, he sought to contribute to "national culture". Indeed, during the Second World War, he worked as a journalist for the Nazi newspaper Fædrelandet. Further, according to the Bovrup File Bonnén joined the DNSAP in April 1940, just prior to Germany's invasion of Denmark.

Bunnén had extensive interests in culture. He developed a new technique called Dansk Fresko (Danish fresco) based on the use of casein paint on cement. He also sang as a tenor in 1915, translated Heinrich Heine in his 1919 Lyrisk Intermezzo and wrote poems for children. In 1918, he opened a painting school. His student was Frede Salling.
