= Danish People's Defence =

- Active: 1943-44
- Country: Denmark
- Allegiance: Nazi Germany
- Branch: Schalburg Corps
- Role: Civilians mostly providing financial backing

The Danish People's Defence (Danish: Dansk Folke Værn or Dansk Folkeværn) was the civilian arm of the Danish Schalburg Corps active from April 1943 to August 1944, in support of the German occupation of Denmark. It was made up of civilians, some of whom were expected to provide financial backing.

The founding of Dansk Folkeværn commenced in April 1943, with Knud Børge Martinsen among the first Dansk Folkeværn leaders. Dansk Folkeværn functioned as the political propaganda arm of the Schalburg Corps, and was open to both men and women. Dansk Folkeværn was formally working independently of the Schalburg Corps, though they shared the same address, and Dansk Folkeværn was described by one of its leaders as "Schalburg Corps' Group II".

Many of Frits Clausen's former supporters in the National Socialist Workers' Party of Denmark (DNSAP) were recruited. For example, a group led by Max Arildskov called Landstormen, which had broken away from the DNSAP after Clausen's poor results in the March 1943 election. In December, Arildskov put his men at the disposal of the Schalburg Corps as regular soldiers, but only around 50 were accepted. The others were put into the Danish People's Defence. In May 1944, DNSAP banned all DNSAP members who were also active in Dansk Folkeværn, Landstormen, Schalburg Corps, among other groups. In August 1944, Dansk Folkeværn was disbanded, and the members went on to join Dansk National Samling.

== Sources ==
- Alkil, Niels, ed. (1945). Besættelsestidens Fakta : dokumentarisk Haandbog med Henblik paa Lovene af 1945 om landsskadelig Virksomhed m.v. Vol. 1. Sagførerraadet. Copenhagen: Schultz.
