= Edifice of Tiflis Commercial Bank (Baku) =

Bank building in Azerbaijan

- Azerbaijani: Tiflis kommersiya bankının binası
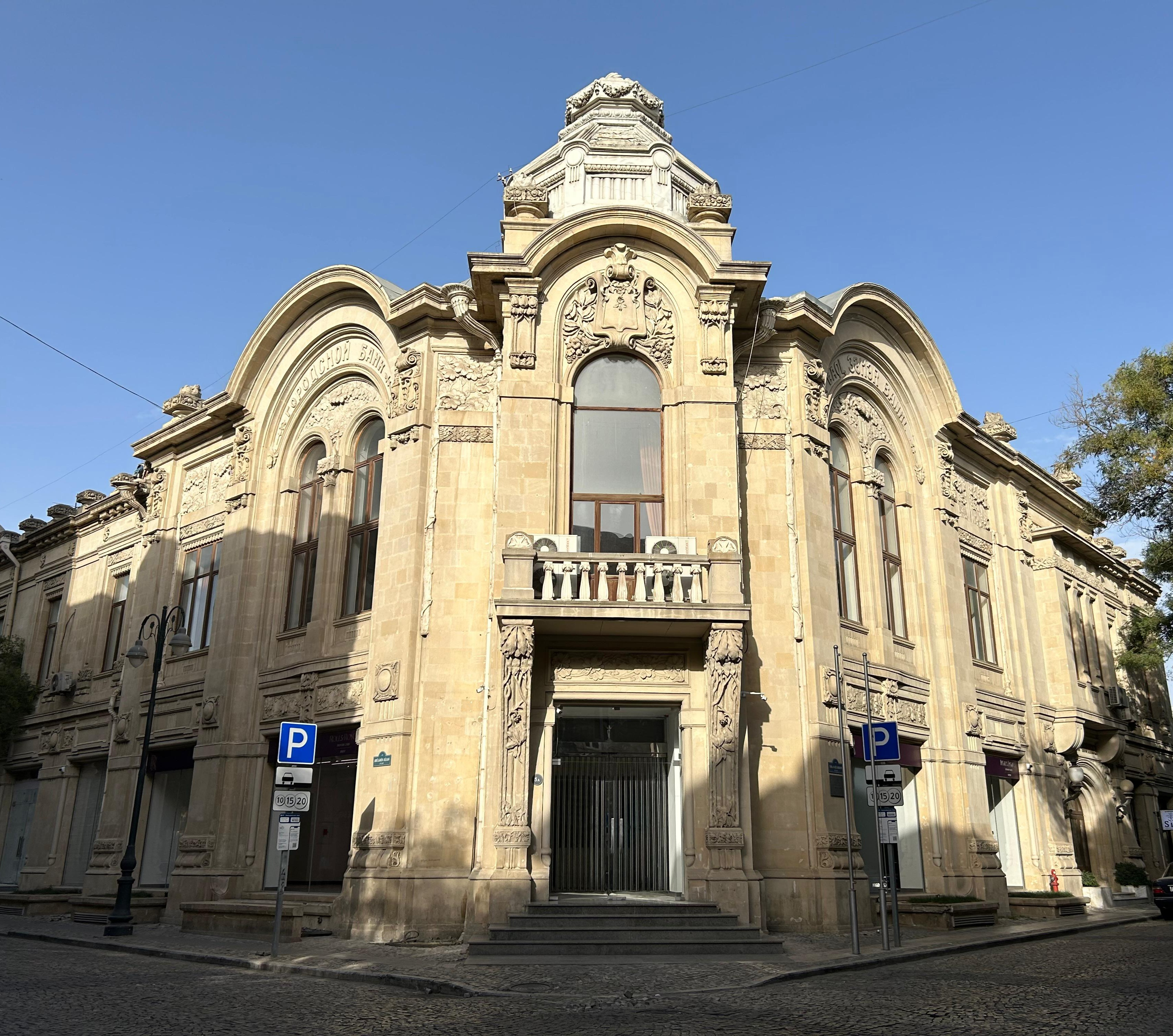
- Interactive map of the Edifice of Tiflis Commercial Bank area

General information
- Architectural style: Art Nouveau
- Location: 5 Tarlan Aliyarbeyov street, Sabail, Baku, Azerbaijan
- Completed: 1901

Edifice of Tiflis Commercial Bank (Baku) (Azerbaijani: Tiflis kommersiya bankının binası) is a building on Tarlan Aliyarbeyov street in the Sabail district of Baku. The building housed the Baku branch of Tiflis Commercial Bank. By an order of Cabinet of Ministers of the Republic of Azerbaijan, dated with 2 August 2001, the building of the bank was taken under state protection as an architectural monument of history and culture of local significance (Inv. No. 3360).

== History ==
The Baku branch of Tiflis Commercial Bank was opened in 1886, and the bank moved to its own building at the corner of Tarlan Aliyarbeyov street (then Milyutinskaya Str.) and Abdulkerim Alizade (then Baryatinskaya Str.) only in 1905.

== Description ==
The edifice, built by the civil architects A.N.Kalgin and G.M.Termikelov, is a vivid example of Baku Art Nouveau style. The building occupies an angular position, has an expressive silhouette and ends with a faceted tower-like volume. The corner part is the architectural and planning center of the building's composition. The modernist drawing of the details of the balcony 7 brackets, frieze, tympanums of arches and other elements is made in the best traditions of stone carving of the Shirvan-Absheron school.

== Photos ==
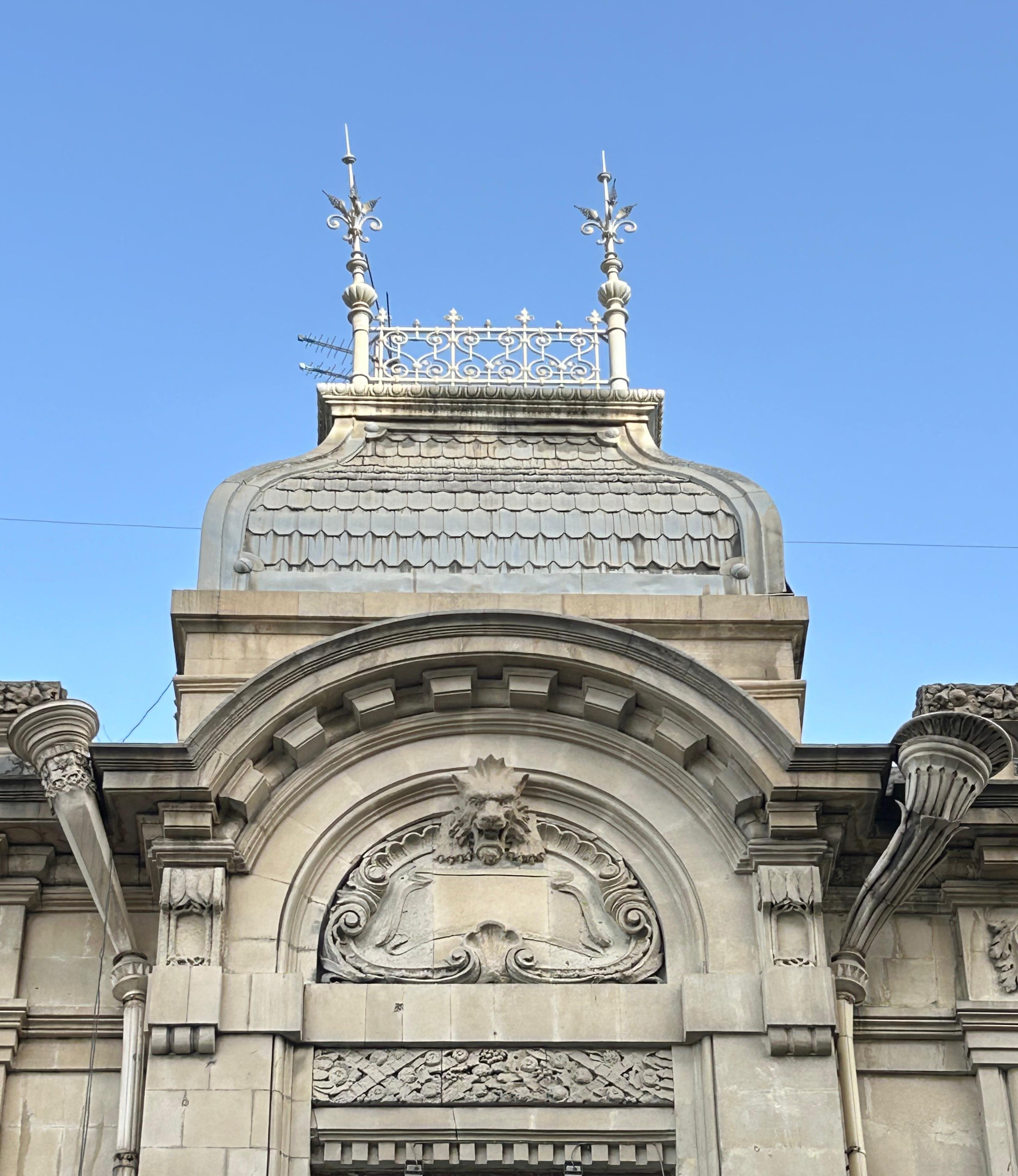

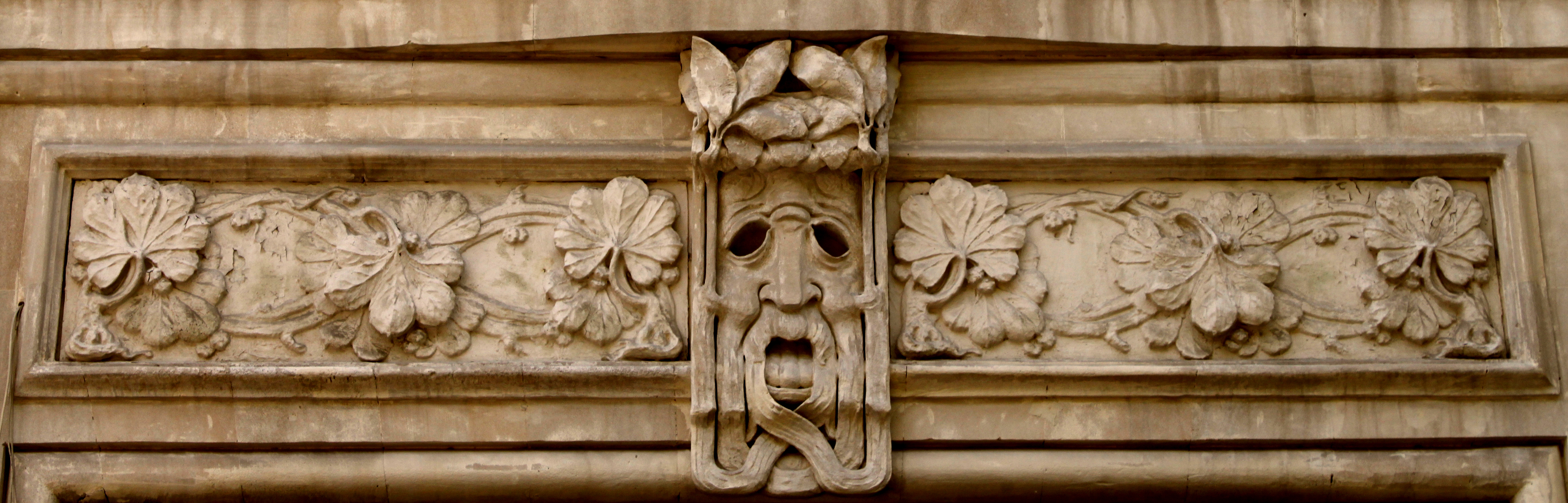

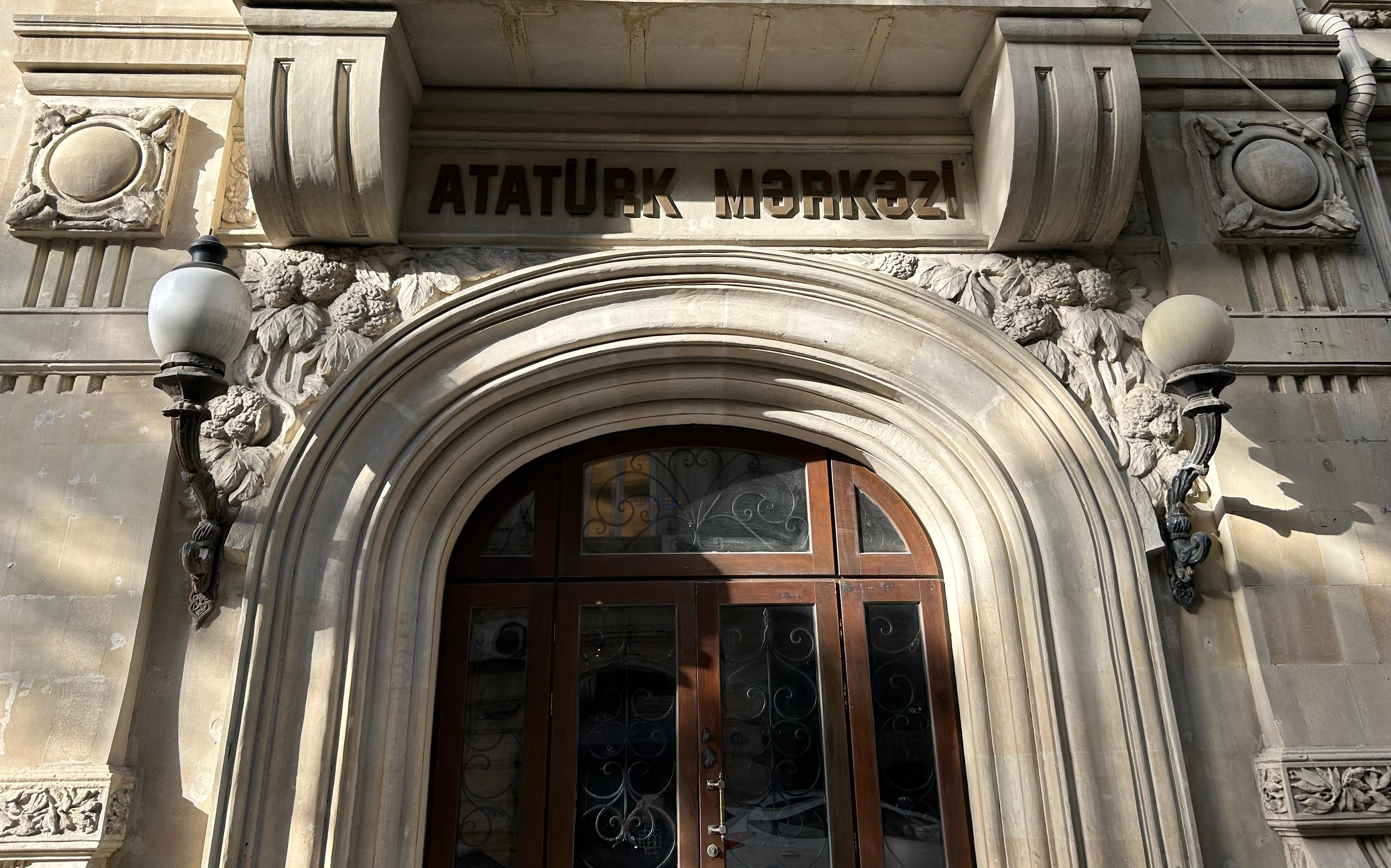

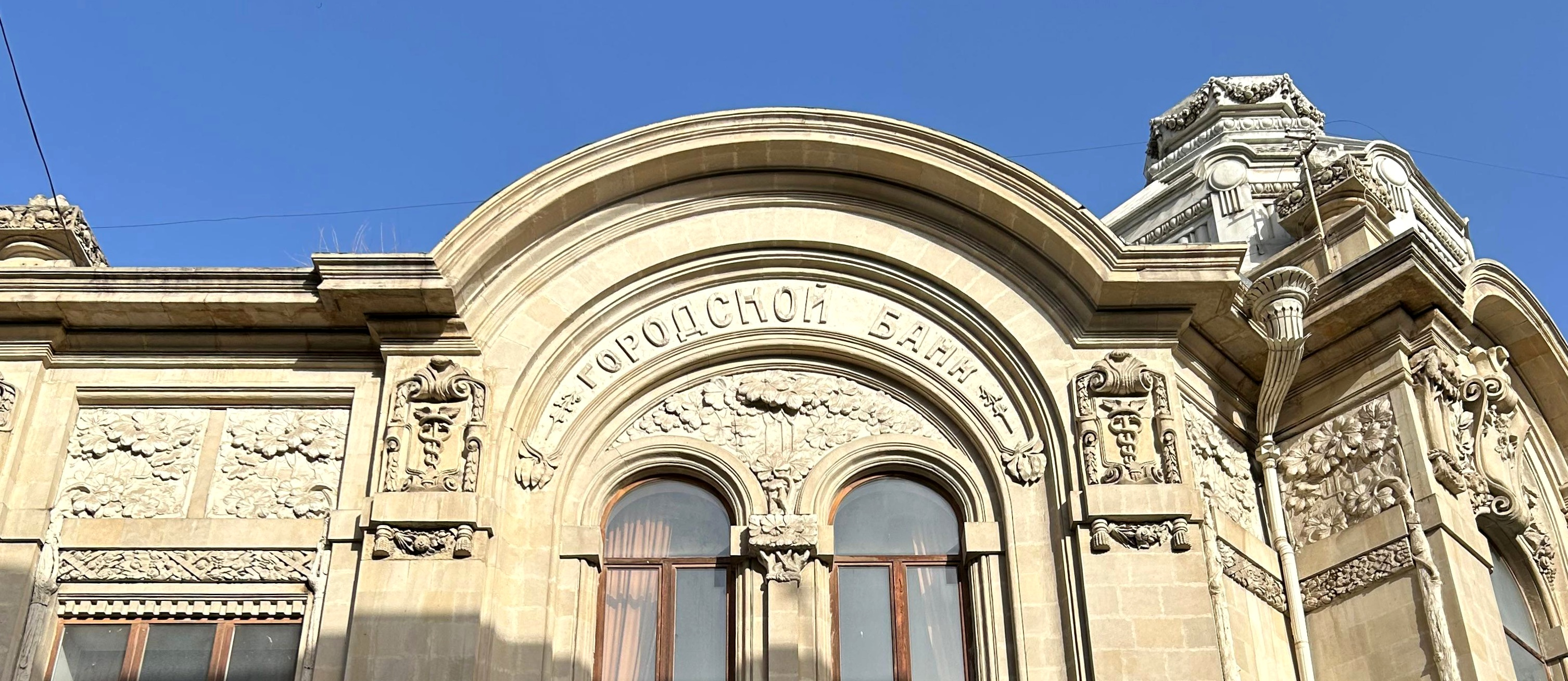
