= Hans Jespersen Koefoed =

Swedish-born Danish painter

Hans Jespersen Koefoed (1884–1975) was a Danish painter. Born in Odensjö, Sweden, he studied painting under Johan Rohde and exhibited with De Tretten in 1912.

Inspired by P.C. Skovgaard, his earlier work is rather traditional but he then developed a freer, more impressionistic approach, without completely breaking with the past. He exhibited at Kunstnernes Efterårsudstilling from 1917 to 1924 and at the 18. November Udstilling from 1924 to 1942.
