= Carl Andreas Koefoed =

Danish agronomist

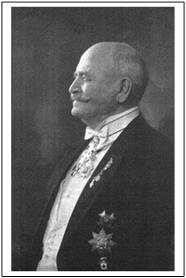
Carl Andreas Koefoed

Carl Andreas Koefoed (known in Russian as Андре́й Андре́евич Кофо́д, Andrey Andreyevich Kofod; 16 October 1855, Skanderborg, Denmark – 7 February 1948, Copenhagen) was a Danish agronomist active in the Russian Empire in the early 20th century. He was the brother of Danish chemist Emil Koefoed.

Koefoed emigrated to Russia at the age of 23, where he used his training in agronomy to work on agrarian reform. He came to play an important role in the Stolypin reform, an attempt to overhaul the traditional obshchina form of agriculture.

When the October Revolution and the subsequent Russian Civil War broke out in 1917, Koefoed fled via the Trans-Siberian Railroad, eventually returning to Denmark.

In 1909, he was made a knight in the Danish Order of the Dannebrog. In 1925, he was awarded the Order's Cross of Honor, and in 1932, he was named Commander Second Class in the Order. In 1946, he published his memoir under the title 50 Aar i Rusland (Fifty Years in Russia).

He is buried in Solbjerg Park Cemetery in Copenhagen.
