= Tiflis Commercial Bank =

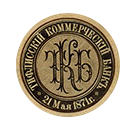

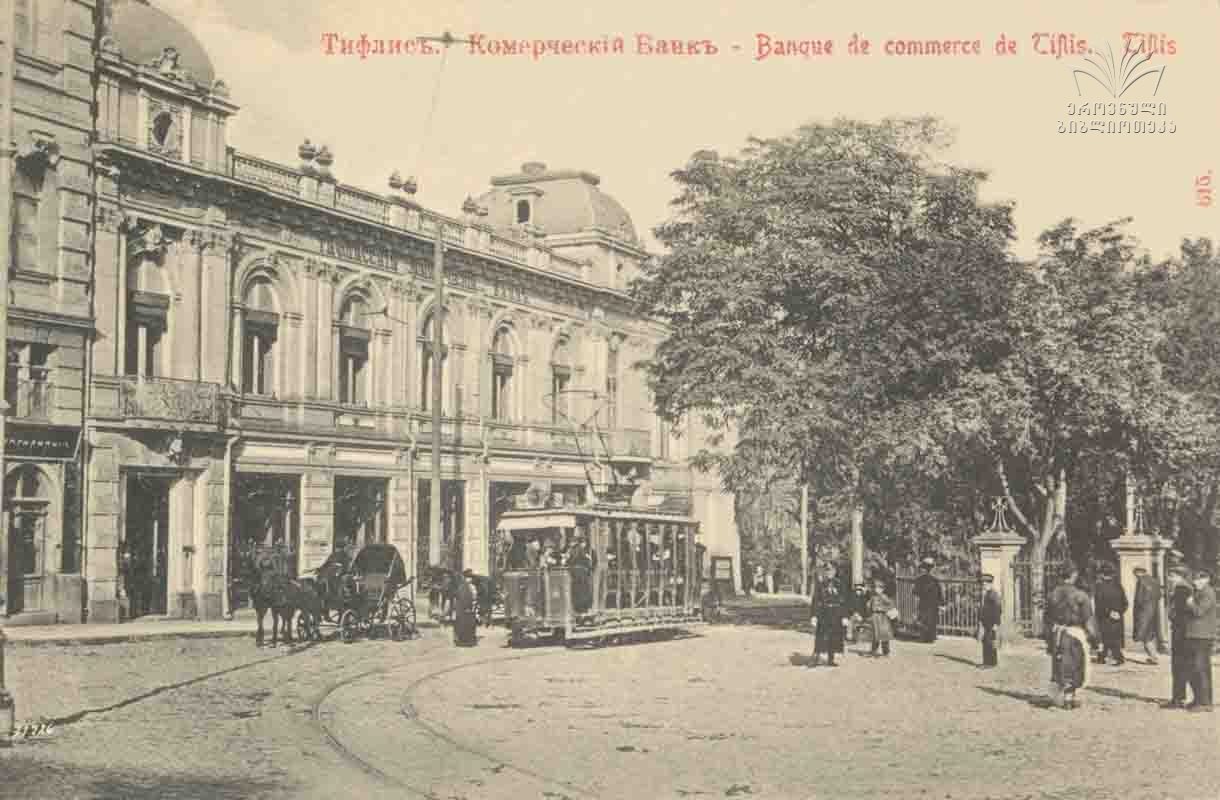
- Postcard depicting Bank HQ in Tiflis.
- Native name: Georgian: ტფილისის კომერციული ბანკი Russian: Тифлисский коммерческий банк
- Industry: Financial services
- Founded: May 21, 1871; 154 years ago in Tiflis, Tiflis Governorate, Russian Empire (now Georgia)
- Headquarters: Tiflis, Tiflis Governorate, Russian Empire
- Area served: South Caucasus
- Revenue: 554,10 Million Russian ruble (1893)

Tiflis Commercial Bank (Georgian: ტფილისის კომერციული ბანკი; Russian: Тифлисский коммерческий банк) was a commercial bank founded in Tiflis, Russian Empire in 1871.

The bank had branches across the Caucasus, including in Baku, Batumi, Yerevan and Grozny.

== History ==
Tiflis Commercial Bank was founded by prominent Tiflisian merchants, industrialists and lessees including E. Davitashvili, A. Evangulashvili, M. Alikhanov, I. Amiraghov, I. Ananov, N. Begtabegov, E. Ejubov, I. Zubalashvili, P. Nadiradze, A. Onikashvili, P. Fridonov, and Korganov. They provided 500,000 rubles as the main capital of the bank. In the following years, the bank's board issued additional shares and raised the basic capital to one million manats.

The bank was the only financial institution from South Caucasus whose shares were listed on the Saint Petersburg Stock Exchange.

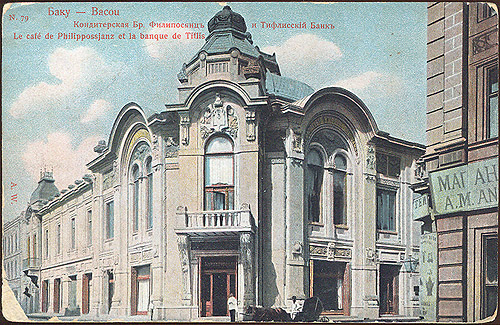
Postcard depicting Baku Branch building [az]

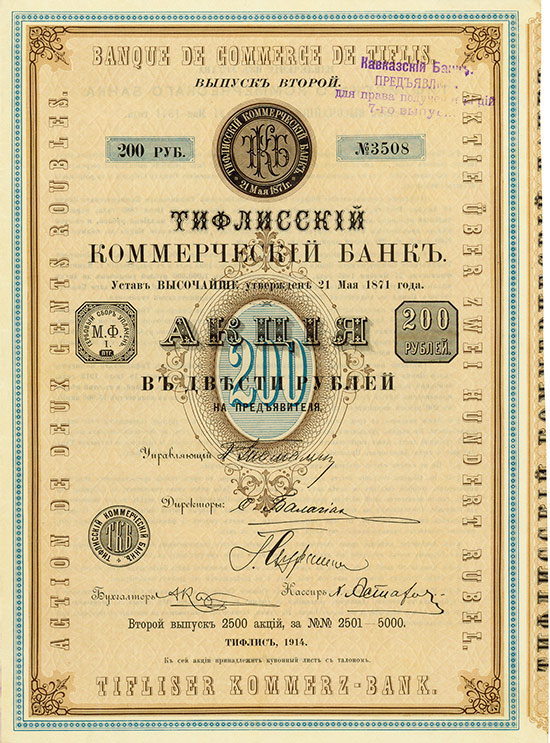
Bond issued in 1914
