= Frits Clausen =

Danish national socialist politician (1893–1947)

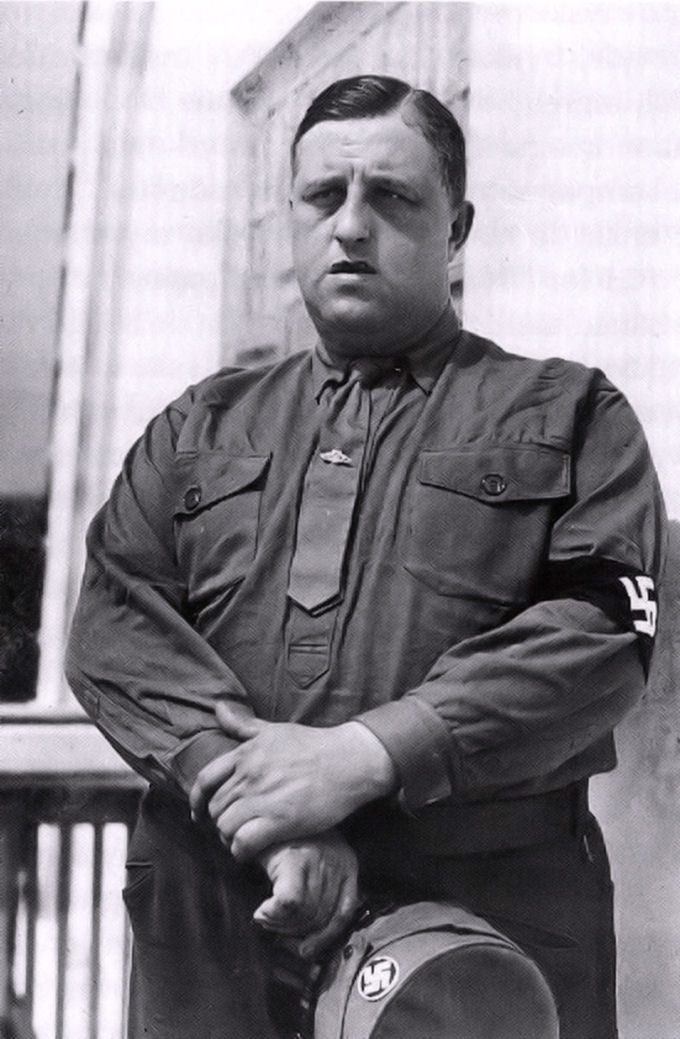
- Frits Clausen

Fører of the National Socialist Workers' Party of Denmark
- In office 1933–1944
- Preceded by: Cay Lembcke
- Succeeded by: Committee

Personal details
- Born: 12 November 1893 Apenrade, Schleswig-Holstein, German Empire (now Aabenraa, Southern Denmark, Denmark)
- Died: 5 December 1947 (aged 54) Vestre Prison, Copenhagen, Denmark
- Party: DNSAP
- Other political affiliations: Conservative People's Party
- Education: Medicine
- Alma mater: Heidelberg University

Military service
- Allegiance: German Empire; Nazi Germany
- Branch/service: Imperial German Army; German Army; Waffen-SS
- Battles/wars: World War I; World War II; Eastern Front

Frits Clausen (12 November 1893 – 5 December 1947) was a Danish far-right politician, collaborator with Nazi Germany, and leader of the National Socialist Workers' Party of Denmark (DNSAP) before and during World War II.

== Life ==
Born in Apenrade, since 1864 a part of Prussia, Clausen served in the German Army during World War I, and was at one time a prisoner of war to Imperial Russia.

After the war, Clausen studied medicine in Heidelberg and became a doctor in 1924, after which he returned to Aabenraa, which had been voted back to Denmark in 1920, and set up a practice. Clausen initially became involved in politics as an advocate of Aabenraa once again becoming a part of Germany,. Still, he eventually turned to Danish politics, advocating causes favouring the German minority in Southern Jutland.

Clausen initially became a conservative party member, but he eventually resigned and, in 1931, joined the DNSAP. Two years later, Clausen ousted the leadership committee of the party (whose members were Einar Jørgensen, C. C. Hansen, and Cay Lembcke) from power and became the party's sole leader.

Under Clausen's direction, the party essentially espoused nationalism and called for a stronger relationship between Denmark and Nazi Germany. At the height of its popularity, the DNSAP had about 20,000 members and 20,000 sympathizers. However, the party fared relatively poorly in the 1939 elections, winning only three seats in the Folketing. A year later, when Germany invaded Denmark, Clausen strongly supported the German occupation and took credit for the lenient way Germany governed the country.

The Germans attempted to reward Clausen for his services by persuading King Christian X to let Clausen and his followers have roles in the nation's government in 1940 and 1943, but the King opposed any such suggestions. The German government was unwilling to forcibly put him in charge of Denmark for fear of angering its people, although there were talks of doing so in 1940 and 1942. The Germans did hope, however, that Clausen would legally seize power over the nation in the 1943 elections. Still, the DNSAP performed just as poorly in the elections as it did in 1939, when they won only three seats in the Folketing.

After the elections, Clausen joined the German Army and saw active service on the Eastern Front as a surgeon, although he did not resign his position as chief of the DNSAP. Clausen returned to Denmark in the spring of 1944, after which time his political career was terminated.

Clausen's failure in the elections and his unwillingness to actively assist in forming a Danish branch of the Schutzstaffel alienated his German supporters. As such, SS Obergruppenführer Dr. Werner Best, the Plenipotentiary of the German Reich for Denmark, convinced Clausen to step down as leader of the party and replaced him with a three-man committee shortly after his return to Denmark.

After Germany's occupation of Denmark ended in May 1945, Clausen was captured and sent to Frøslev Prison Camp. On August 1, 1946, he was expelled from the Danish Medical Association. He was to be given a formal trial, but he died of a heart attack in Vestre Prison in Copenhagen on December 5, 1947, the same day that his indictment was filed.

== Sources ==
- Ole Ravn, Fører uden folk : Frits Clausen og Danmarks National Socialistiske Arbejder-Parti, University of Southern Denmark, 2007. ISBN 978-87-7674-203-4. (in Danish).
- John T. Lauridsen (ed.), "Føreren har ordet!" : Frits Clausen om sig selv og DNSAP, Museum Tusculanum, 2003. ISBN 87-7289-759-7. (in Danish).
