= Knud Børge Martinsen =

Danish officer

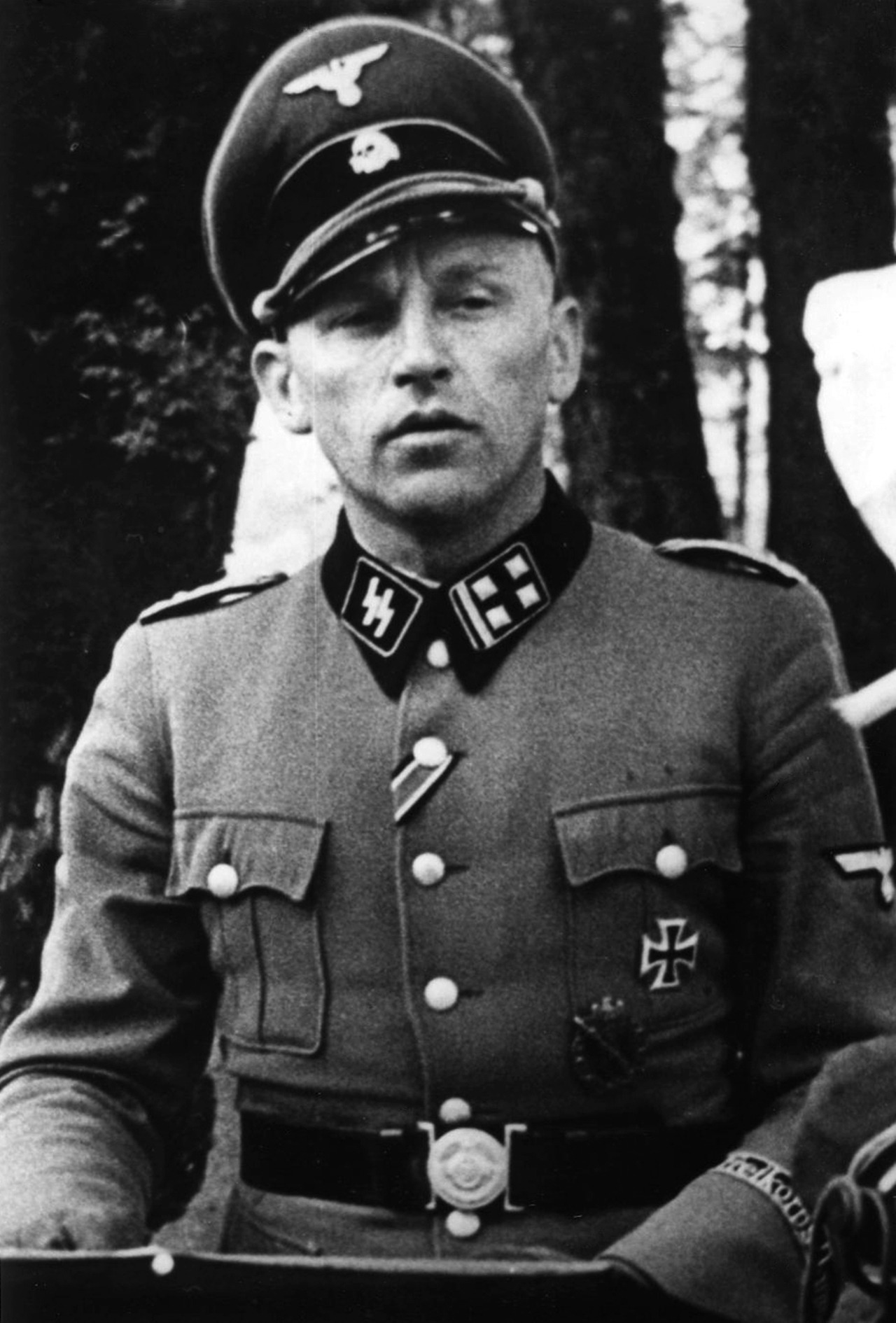
- Knud B. Martinsen as SS-Obersturmbannführer
- Born: 30 November 1905; Sandved, Denmark
- Died: 25 June 1949 (aged 43); Bådsmandsstrædes Kaserne, Christianshavn, Denmark
- Cause of death: Execution by firing squad
- Military career
- Allegiance: Denmark; Nazi Germany
- Branch: Royal Danish Army; Waffen-SS
- Service years: 1928–1940; 1941–1945
- Rank: Kaptajnløjtnant; SS-Obersturmbannführer
- Commands: Frikorps Danmark

Knud Børge Martinsen (30 November 1905 – 25 June 1949) was a Danish officer and the third commander of Frikorps Danmark.

== Biography ==
Knud Børge Martinsen was born in Sandved in 1905, son of tailor Hans Kristian Martinsen and wife Ottilia Marie Poulsen. He became a soldier in 1928. After only ten years of service he was an officer with a rank of Captain Lieutenant. In 1940 he was attending the general staff course on Frederiksberg Palace and was looking forward to a promising career.

The Occupation of Denmark on 9 April 1940 was a big shock to him, but on 26 April 1940 he joined the Danish National Socialist Workers' Party of Denmark (DNSAP) and took part of several demonstrations in his uniform which ended up in his military papers and prevented further career advances. Martinsen therefore resigned and joined the Waffen-SS and commanded Frikorps Danmark's 2nd company under Christian Peder Kryssing and the 4th company under Christian Frederik von Schalburg. Actually Martinsen was temporarily commander of Frikorps Danmark between Kryssing's resignation and von Schalburg's appointment.

Martinsen was again temporarily commander between von Schalburg's death and Hans Albert von Lettow-Vorbeck's appointment. When von Lettow-Vorbeck was killed only two days after his appointment, Martinsen took over as commander and remained as commander until the disbandment of Frikorps Danmark on 20 May 1943. Together with most of Frikorps Danmark he was transferred to SS-Panzergrenadier Regiment 24 Danmark under 11th SS Volunteer Panzergrenadier Division Nordland.

On 28 July 1943 Martinsen left his command and returned to Denmark to establish and command the Schalburg Corps as a recruitment unit for the Waffen-SS. In October 1944 Martinsen was relieved from his position and then arrested and imprisoned in Gestapo's prison in Berlin. Later he was transferred to the Sicherheitsdienst (SD) where he escaped and returned to Denmark.

On 5 May 1945 Martinsen was arrested in his home for his involvement in the Schalburg Corps and for two murders. One of the murders was the shooting in March 1944 in the headquarters of the Schalburg Corps of a fellow member, Fritz Henning Tonnies von Eggers, whom Martinsen believed had committed adultery with his wife.

He was sentenced to death and on 25 June 1949 at 01:00 executed by firing squad in Copenhagen.

== Dates of rank ==
Dates of ranks:

Rank	Component	Date
First lieutenant	Royal Danish Army	1 November 1933
Captain lieutenant	Royal Danish Army	1 April 1939
SS-Hauptsturmführer	Waffen-SS	1 May 1942
SS-Sturmbannführer	Waffen-SS	21 June 1942
SS-Obersturmbannführer	Waffen-SS	18 February 1943

== Bibliography ==
- Martinsen, K.B. Frikorps Danmarks Kampe [The Battles of Free Corps Denmark] (in Danish). Forlaget 1944. 38 pages.
