= Schalburg Cross =

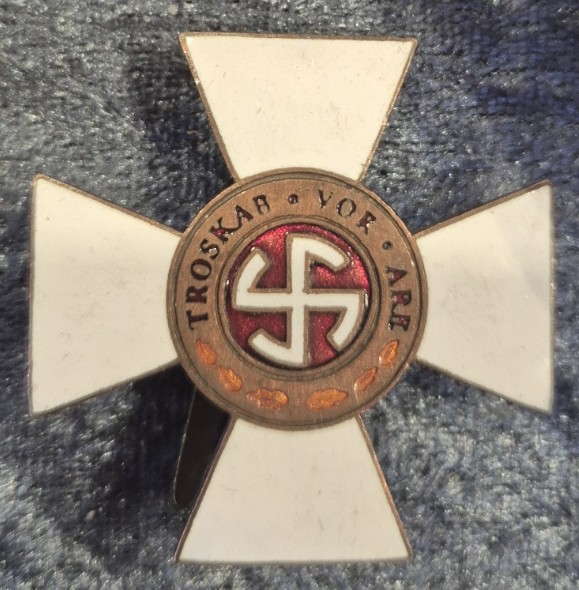
- Schalburg Cross from World War II
- Type: Badge
- Awarded for: Recognition of service against the Danish resistance movement and for those serving or killed in action in the Eastern Front
- Presented by: Nazi Germany
- Eligibility: Officers, NCOs and enlisted ranks
- Campaign: World War II
- Established: Late in World War II

Highlights
- Total: 1 (to a member who had been killed in fighting with the Danish resistance movement)
- Total awarded posthumously: 1

The Schalburg Cross (Danish: Schalburgkors, German: Schalburgkreuz) was a decoration instituted for officers, NCOs and enlisted men in the Danish Schalburg Corps during World War II. Although many of these crosses were manufactured, there is only one known record of the Schalburg Cross having been issued, and it was done so posthumously.

== History ==
The date the Schalburg Cross was instituted is unknown. It could be later than 1943, otherwise picture(s) of them being worn would have surfaced. It was named after Christian Frederik von Schalburg, commander of the Frikorps Danmark who was killed in combat operations in the Demyansk Pocket in 1942. The cross was manufactured by the Danish firm Heimbürger in Copenhagen.

The cross was awarded to Schalburg Corps members for recognition of service against the Danish resistance movement and for those serving or killed in action in the Eastern Front. It has been recorded once that a cross was awarded to a Schalburg Corps member killed in action probably from the resistance.

The Schalburg Cross was intended to be worn on the left breast pocket of its recipient's uniform. According to military historians some of the unissued crosses were discovered in the Schalburg corps HQ after the retreat of the Germans in May 1945 and were kept as souvenirs by the Danish population. Indeed, stories have widely circulated that they were given to members of the crowds that flocked the streets of Copenhagen in May 1945 after the liberation from German troops.

== Classes ==
There were two classes issued: one for officers and NCOs, and the other for enlisted. Both crosses were die struck and measure 50mm x 50mm.

Enlisted men wore a cross painted in off-white color with golden outer edges. The cross has a medallion in the center, which is soldered to the cross. The medallion has the golden inscription Our Honour is Loyalty (Danish: Troskab er Vor Ære) and golden oak leaves below. In the inner ring is a white mobile swastika with an opaque red paint in the background.

The officers' cross has the same colors but was made of enamelled with the cross being white. The red paint in the medallion was substituted by opaque red enamelled and the oak leaves are gilded.

The reverse on both crosses is flat with a semi scoop shape in the center and a single long golden pin attached on the top of the cross. Of the enamelled badges about 5 to 6 decorations are known in Denmark.

== See also ==
- Military decorations of the Third Reich
