= Christian Frederik von Schalburg =

Danish army officer

- Konstantin Fedorovitch von Schalburg
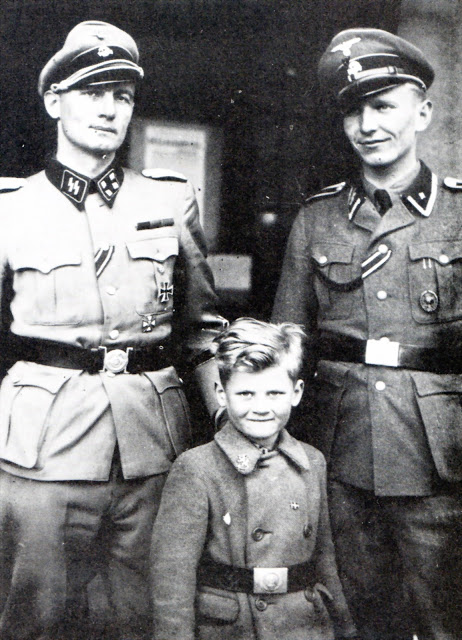
- (from left to right) Christian von Schalburg, his son Alex, and Søren Kam
- Born: 15 April 1906; Zmeinogorsk, Russian Empire
- Died: 2 June 1942 (aged 36); Demjansk, Russian SFSR, Soviet Union
- Spouse: Helga Frederikke von Bülow
- Military career
- Allegiance: Denmark; Finland; Nazi Germany
- Branch: Royal Danish Army; Waffen-SS
- Service years: 1929–1942
- Rank: Kaptajnløjtnant (Denmark); SS-Obersturmbannführer (Nazi Germany)
- Commands: Frikorps Danmark, Mar – Jun 1942
- Awards: Iron Cross First Class; Iron Cross Second Class; Winter War Medal

Christian Frederik von Schalburg (15 April 1906 – 2 June 1942) was a Danish army officer, the second commander of Free Corps Denmark and brother of Vera Schalburg.

== Biography ==
Christian Frederik von Schalburg received a military education in the Tsar's cadet corps and lived in Russia until the October Revolution of 1917 when he fled with his family to Denmark. These dramatic events caused him to long for Russia and to hate communists.

He joined the Danish Army in 1929. In the Royal Life Guards he was eventually described as 'unstable and for the army possibly a dangerous man'. In a letter to the king he defended himself as a victim of Jewish slander.

From 1939 von Schalburg headed the youth branch (NSU) of the National Socialist Workers' Party of Denmark (DNSAP), where he became very popular. That same year he and a group of NSU members called 'bloddrengene' (the blood boys) were among the Danish volunteers for the Finnish Winter War against the USSR in 1939–1940. He was thus abroad when Denmark was occupied by Nazi Germany on 9 April 1940. Despite his Nazi beliefs he was deeply distressed that Denmark had surrendered almost without fighting.

In September 1940 with the consent of the Danish army and the king, von Schalburg joined the Waffen-SS and served with 5th SS Division Wiking as a SS-Hauptsturmführer. In February 1941 he suggested to his friend, head of DNSAP Frits Clausen, the formation of a Danish SS unit, 'Regiment Dannebrog', to be commanded by himself.

During Operation Barbarossa von Schalburg served on the divisional staff of Division Wiking. He was awarded the Iron Cross of 1st and 2nd class while serving in Division Wiking.

On 27 February 1942 von Schalburg arrived at Frikorps Danmark in Treskau and on March 1 he was given command of the corps, now ranked SS-Sturmbannführer (Major).

The SS gave von Schalburg this command mostly because of his political reliability and willingness to provide his corps with the required ideological training and also because he enjoyed good relations with his subordinates, all qualities that his predecessor C.P. Kryssing lacked.

As part of his responsibility for the unit's training, he introduced lessons in German and Russian, a 1/2 hour of PE every morning and extended duty hours from 5am (05:00) to 8pm (20:00).

On 8 May 1942 von Schalburg was flown by Junkers Ju 52 with parts of the corps into the Demyansk Pocket.

On 2 June 1942 von Schalburg initiated the first offensive operation of Frikorps Danmark. In an attempt to monitor the progress of the battle, von Schalburg advanced towards the front line, but stepped on a mine and was moments later killed by shrapnel from a Russian artillery shell. The subsequent rescue of his corpse, which caused a casualty, revealed extensive injuries including a leg torn off at the hip and a missing foot.

== Legacy ==
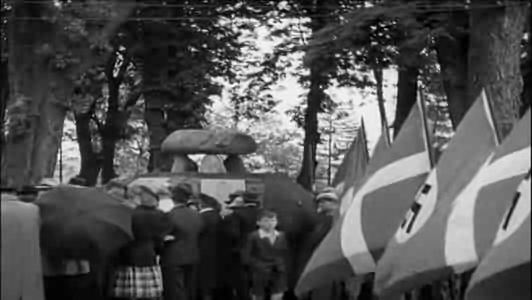
From the inauguration of the memorial for fallen, Danish members of the SS on the second anniversary of von Schalburg's death

On 3 June 1942, von Schalburg's body was transported in a coffin draped in Dannebrog to the cemetery of the corps located in the small village Biakovo in the Demjansk area. The commanding officer of the 3rd SS Division Totenkopf SS-Brigadeführer Hellmuth Becker spoke at the funeral.

On the same day, Reichsführer-SS Heinrich Himmler posthumously promoted von Schalburg to SS-Obersturmbannführer, effective from 1 June.

In Denmark, the newspaper of the DNSAP 'Fædrelandet' (the Fatherland) filled the front page with the news of the fallen commander, and a memorial service for von Schalburg was disrupted by protests shouted by a student. The poet Valdemar Rørdam who had already gotten himself into public scandal with a poem praising Hitler, further alienated himself from the Danish public when he published a tribute to Schalburg.

A Danish medal, the Schalburg Cross and the Danish Germanic-SS Schalburg Corps, was named after von Schalburg. His widow called herself Valet de chambre (Kammerjunkerinde) Helle von Schalburg and founded Schalburgs mindefond (memorial fund), which sent packages to Danish SS volunteers on the Eastern Front.

On the second anniversary of von Schalburg's death commander of the Schalburg Corps K. B. Martinsen inaugurated a memorial for fallen, Danish members of the SS. Following the liberation the memorial was destroyed.

The fact that von Schalburg advanced, against the advice of a company commander, towards the front line and jeopardized not only his own life but also those of his corps made him a reckless commander in some eyes. However, his record indicates that he was a competent commander and in the SS, that behaviour was not uncommon, and the losses of commanders were exceptionally high, including von Schalburg's successor, who fell just two days after arriving at the corps.
