= Free Corps Denmark =

- Frikorps Danmark
- Free Corps Denmark Armshield
- Active: 1941–43
- Country: Denmark
- Allegiance: Nazi Germany
- Branch: Waffen-SS
- Type: Infantry
- Size: 6,000 men (total, 1941–43)

Free Corps Denmark (Danish: Frikorps Danmark, German: Freikorps „Danmark“) was a unit of the Waffen-SS during World War II consisting of volunteers from Denmark. It was established following an initiative by the National Socialist Workers' Party of Denmark (DNSAP) in the immediate aftermath of the German invasion of the Soviet Union in June 1941 and subsequently endorsed by Denmark's government which authorised officers of the Royal Danish Army to enlist in the unit. It participated in fighting on the Eastern Front and was disbanded in 1943. During the course of the war, approximately 6,000 Danes joined the corps, including 77 officers of the Royal Danish Army.

== History ==
Footage from a Waffen-SS memorial service near Birkerød in 1944. Among the attendees were Dr. Werner Best and Knud Børge Martinsen.

=== Establishment ===
Denmark had signed a treaty of nonaggression with Nazi Germany in 1939. Germany invoked this treaty on 9 April 1940, when it ordered the military occupation of Denmark under the guise of protecting the Danes from British invasion. Faced with potential German aerial bombing, King Christian X and the Danish government accepted "protection of the Reich" and permitted the "peaceful occupation" of the country in return for nominal political independence. The Danes began a policy of collaboration that included diplomatic and economic support of Germany. The German diplomat Cécil von Renthe-Fink was accredited to the Danish King and Cabinet as Reichsbevollmächtigter ("Imperial Plenipotentiary") and charged with the duty of supervising Danish government.

At the outset of the German invasion of the Soviet Union in 1941, Germany asked Denmark to form a military corps to fight with the Germans against the Soviets. On 29 June 1941, seven days after the invasion had begun, the DNSAP newspaper Fædrelandet ("The Fatherland") proclaimed the creation of the Free Corps Denmark. Danish Foreign Minister Erik Scavenius entered into an agreement with the Reichsbevollmächtigter that officers and soldiers of the Royal Danish Army wishing to join this corps would be granted leave and allowed to retain their rank. The Danish Cabinet issued an announcement stating that "Lieut. Colonel Christian Peder Kryssing, Chief of the 5th Artillery Regiment, Holbæk, has with the consent of the Royal Danish Government assumed command over Free Corps Denmark." Free Corps Denmark was one of "four national legions" established by the Waffen-SS in 1941. The original number of accepted recruits in 1941 was 1,164 men.

The role of the Danish government in the formation of the Free Corps Denmark is today disputed. Some authorities maintain that the Corps was unique among the legions of foreign volunteers fighting for Hitler in that it carried the official sanction of its home government. Others maintain that while the Danish government may have sanctioned formation of the Corps, it did not itself form the Corps.

=== Operations ===
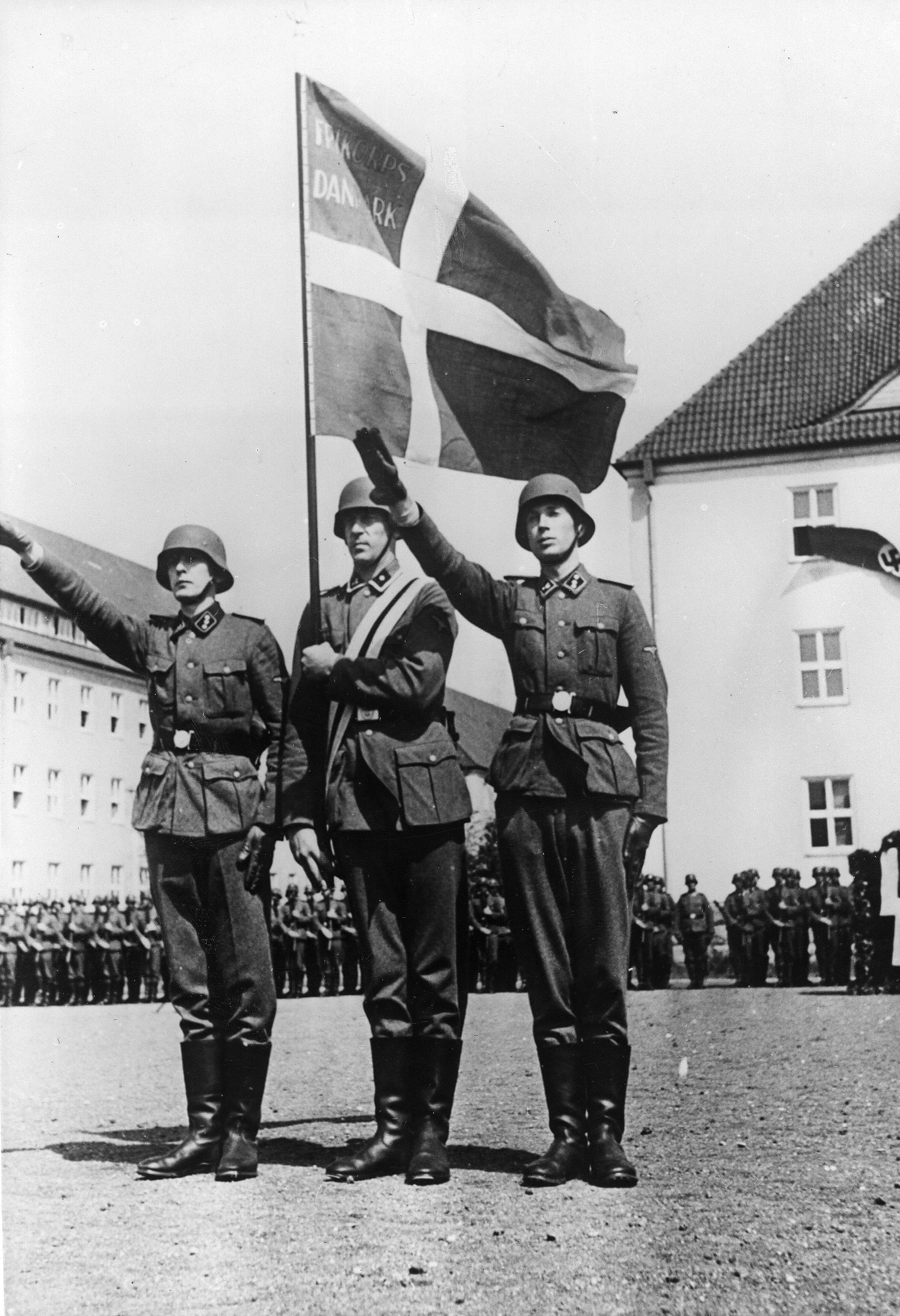
Members of Free Corps Denmark taking an oath, July 1941

With about 1,000 recruits, the corps was sent to Langenhorn barracks in Hamburg for basic training in late July 1941. It was considered ready for action by 15 September and sent to Owińska in Poland.

Commander Kryssing was dismissed in February 1942 for insufficient ideological adherence to Nazism. He was transferred to the artillery where he ended his career as a general.

Christian Frederik von Schalburg replaced Kryssing as the leader of Frikorps Danmark; von Schalburg was a Danish-Russian aristocrat, anti-communist, and member of the DNSAP who had been raised in Russia and had seen the aftermath of the Russian revolution in 1917.

On 8 May 1942, the corps was ordered to the front line where it engaged in fighting near Demyansk, south of Lake Ilmen and Novgorod. Schalburg was killed during the night of 2 June. His German replacement, Hans Albert von Lettow-Vorbeck, was killed only a few days later. On 11 July, the Danish officer Knud Børge Martinsen took command of the corps.

The corps returned to Denmark from August to October 1942 and met with much hostility from the civilian population. On 13 November, the corps was redeployed to Jelgava in Latvia. Originally intended for anti-partisan activities, the corps was then moved up to the front line. In December, the corps engaged in intense fighting at the Battle of Velikiye Luki alongside Germany's 1st SS Infantry Brigade.

The Free Corps was withdrawn from the front line in April 1943 and sent to the Bavarian town of Grafenwöhr, near Nuremberg. It was formally disbanded on 6 May 1943. It was reformed as SS-Panzergrenadier Regiment 24 "Denmark" (SS-Panzergrenadier-Regiment 24 "Danmark") and integrated into the recently formed 11th SS Volunteer Panzergrenadier Division Nordland. Returning to Denmark in February 1943, Martinsen established the Schalburg Corps, a paramilitary formation affiliated to the Germanic SS which carried out violent attacks and murders on perceived political dissenters in Denmark. It drew particularly on former soldiers who had served in the Eastern Front and its creation weakened the DNSAP.

== Demography ==
It is estimated that approximately 6,000 Danes served in the Free Corps Denmark.

A 1998 study showed that the average recruit to Free Corps Denmark was a member of the DNSAP and/or a member of the German minority in Denmark, and that recruitment was very broad socially. Danish historian Bo Lidegaard notes: "The relationship between the population and the corps was freezing cold, and legionnaires on leave time and again came into fights with civilians meeting the corps' volunteers with massive contempt." Lidegaard gives the following figures for 1941: 6,000 Danish citizens had signed up and were approved for German army duty and 1,500 of these belonged to the German minority in Denmark. Half of the over 12,000 Danes that initially volunteered for active service were regarded as being not suitable for active service.

== Commanders ==
List of Commanders:

No.	Portrait	Commander	Took office	Left office	Time in office
1	Christian Peder Kryssing	SS-Obersturmbannführer; Christian Peder Kryssing (1891–1976)	19 July 1941	23 February 1942	219 days
-	Knud Børge Martinsen	SS-Hauptsturmführer; Knud Børge Martinsen (1905–1949); Acting	23 February 1942	27 February 1942	4 days
2	Christian Frederik von Schalburg	SS-Obersturmbannführer; Christian Frederik von Schalburg (1905–1942)	1 March 1942	2 June 1942 †	93 days
-	Knud Børge Martinsen	SS-Sturmbannführer; Knud Børge Martinsen (1905–1949); Acting	2 June 1942	9 June 1942	7 days
3	Hans-Albert von Lettow-Vorbeck	SS-Obersturmbannführer; Hans-Albert von Lettow-Vorbeck (1901–1942)	9 June 1942	11 June 1942 †	2 days
4	Knud Børge Martinsen	SS-Sturmbannführer; Knud Børge Martinsen (1905–1949)	11 June 1942	21 March 1943	283 days
-	Poul Neergaard-Jacobsen	SS-Sturmbannführer; Poul Neergaard-Jacobsen (1905–1949); Acting	21 March 1943	20 May 1943	60 days

== Bibliography ==
- Claus Bundgård Christensen, Niels Bo Poulsen & Peter Scharff Smith, Under Hagekors og Dannebrog - Danskere i Waffen SS 1940-45, Aschehoug, 1998. (In Danish with English summary). ISBN .
- Lidegaard, Bo (2003). Dansk udenrigspolitiks historie. Overleveren - 1914-1945. Danmarks Nationalleksikon. ISBN 9788777890932.
- Stein, George H (1984). The Waffen SS: Hitler's Elite Guard at War, 1939-1945. Cornell University Press. ISBN 978-0801492754.
- Littlejohn, David (1972). The Patriotic Traitors: A History of Collaboration in German-Occupied Europe, 1940-45. London: Heinemann. OCLC 463008186.
