= Germanic SS =

Nordic Waffen-SS units

- The Germanic SS were foreign branches of the Allgemeine SS.

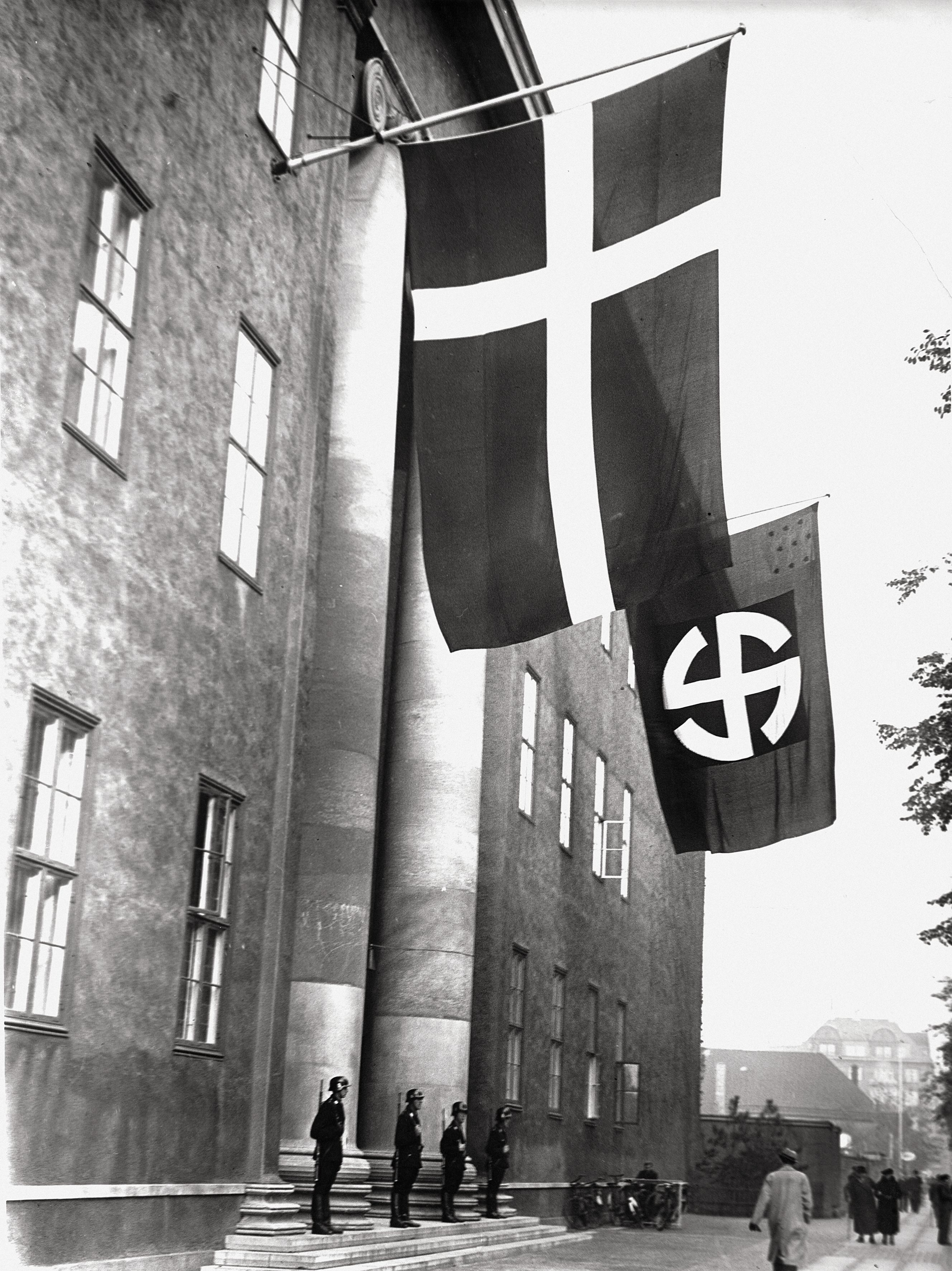
- Headquarters of the Schalburg Corps in Copenhagen, Denmark, c.1943.

Agency overview
- Formed: September 1940
- Dissolved: 8 May 1945
- Jurisdiction: Germany and German-occupied Europe
- Headquarters: SS-Hauptamt
- Employees: ~35,000 c.1943
- Minister responsible: Heinrich Himmler, 1939–1945
- Parent agency: Schutzstaffel

The Germanic SS (German: Germanische SS) was the collective name given to paramilitary and political organisations established in parts of German-occupied Europe between 1939 and 1945 under the auspices of the Schutzstaffel (SS). The units were modeled on the Allgemeine SS in Nazi Germany and established in Belgium, Denmark, the Netherlands, and Norway—population groups who were considered to be especially "racially suitable" by the Nazis. They typically served as local security police augmenting German units of the Gestapo, Sicherheitsdienst (SD), and other departments of the German Reich Security Main Office (RSHA), rendering them culpable for their participation in Nazi atrocities.

== Establishment ==
The Nazi idea behind co-opting additional Germanic people into the SS stems to a certain extent from the Völkisch belief that the original Aryan-Germanic homeland rested in Scandinavia and that, in a racial-ideological sense, people from there or the neighbouring northern European regions were a human reservoir of Nordic/Germanic blood. Conquest of Western Europe gave the Germans, and especially the SS, access to these "potential recruits" who were considered part of the wider "Germanic family". Four of these conquered nations were ripe with Germanic peoples according to Nazi estimations (Denmark, Norway, Netherlands, and Flanders). Heinrich Himmler referred to people from these lands in terms of their Germanic suitability as, "blutsmässig unerhört wertvolle Kräfte" ("by blood exceptionally valuable assets"). Accordingly, some of them were recruited into the SS and enjoyed the highest privileges as did foreign workers from these regions, to include unrestrained sexual contact with German women. Eager to expand their reach, Nazis like Chief of the SS Main Office, Gottlob Berger considered the Germanic SS as foundational for a burgeoning German Empire.

Himmler's vision for a Germanic SS started with grouping the Netherlands, Belgian, and French Flanders together into a western-Germanic state called Burgundia, which would be policed by the SS as a security buffer for Germany. In 1940, the first manifestation of the Germanic SS appeared in Flanders as the Allgemeene SS Vlaanderen to be joined two-months later by the Dutch Nederlandsche SS, and in May 1941 the Norwegian Norges SS was formed. The final nation to contribute to the Germanic SS was Denmark, whose Germansk Korpset (later called the Schalburg Corps) came into being in April 1943. For the SS, they did not think of their compatriots in terms of national borders but in terms of Germanic racial makeup, known conceptually to them as Deutschtum, a greater idea which transcended traditional political boundaries. While the SS leadership foresaw an imperialistic and semi-autonomous relationship for the Nordic or Germanic countries like Denmark, the Netherlands, and Norway as co-bearers of a greater Germanic empire, Hitler refused to grant them the same degree of independence despite ongoing pressure from ranking members of the SS.

== Duties and participation in atrocities ==
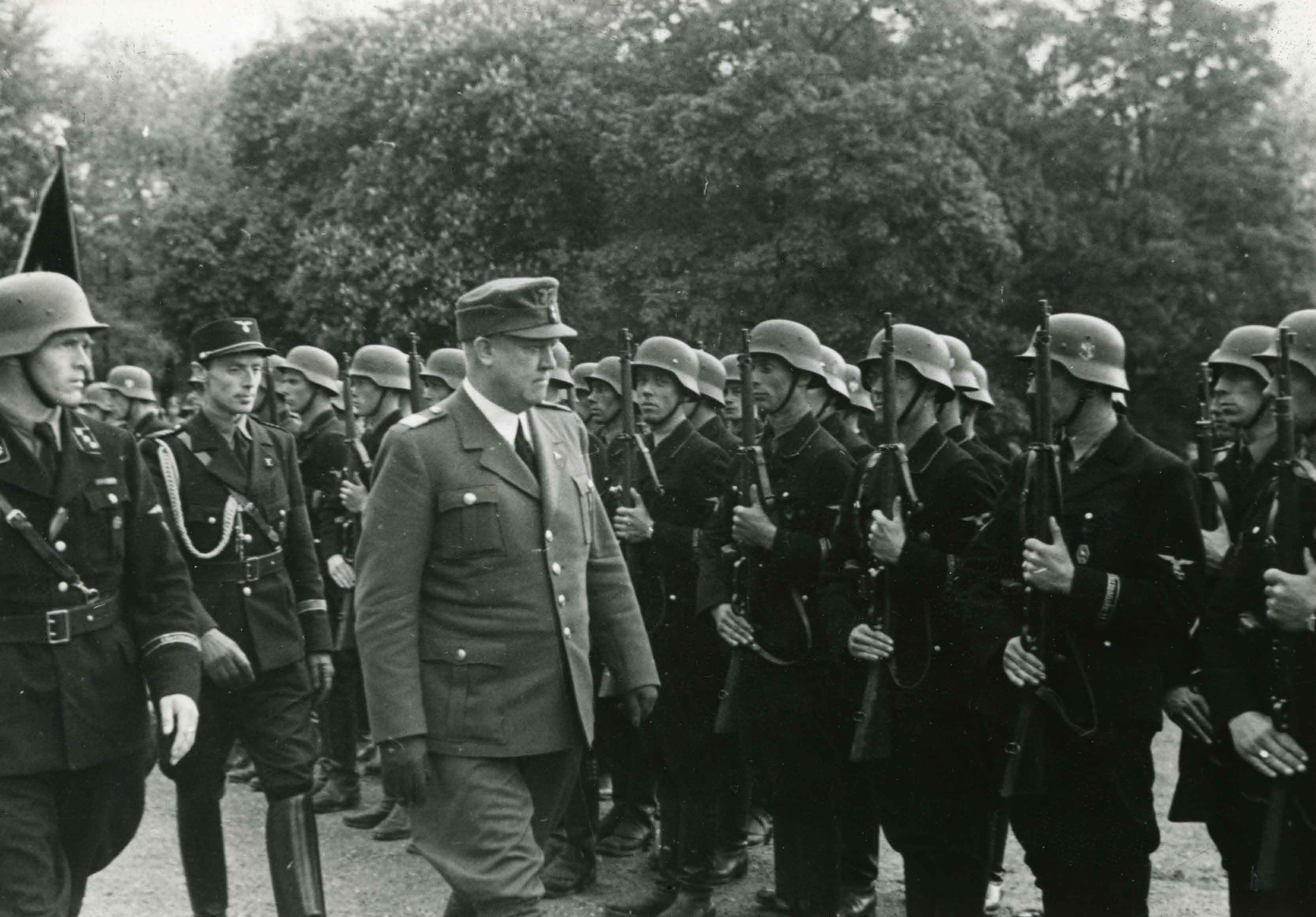
Vidkun Quisling inspects the Germanske SS Norge on the Palace Square in Oslo, Norway

The purpose of the Germanic SS was to enforce Nazi racial doctrine, especially anti-Semitic ideas. They typically served as local security police augmenting German units of the Gestapo, Sicherheitsdienst (SD), and other main departments of the Reich Security Main Office (Reichssicherheitshauptamt, RSHA). Their principal responsibilities during wartime were to root-out partisans, subversive organizations, and any group opposed to Nazi ideas. In other cases, these foreign units of the SS were employed by major German firms to distribute propaganda for the Nazi cause among their compatriots and to police and control workers. In addition, the inclusion of other Germanic peoples was part of the Nazi attempt to collectively Germanize Europe, and for them, Germanization entailed the creation of an empire ruled by Germanic people at the expense of other races.

One of the most notorious groups was in the Netherlands, where the Germanic SS was employed to round-up Jews. Of the 140,000 Jews that had lived in the Netherlands prior to 1940, around 24,000 survived the war by hiding. Despite their relatively small numbers, a total of 532 Jews from Oslo were hunted down by the Norwegian Police and the Germanske SS Norge (Norwegian General SS); once caught, they were deported to Auschwitz. More Jews were rounded-up elsewhere, but the total number of Norwegian Jews captured never reached a thousand throughout the course of the war. Similar measures were planned by the SS against Danish Jews, who totaled about 6,500, but most of them managed to go into hiding or escape to Sweden before the senior German representative in Denmark, SS-General Werner Best, could marshal the SS forces at his disposal and complete his planned raids and deportations.

== Organisations ==
The following countries raised active Germanic SS detachments:

Country or region	Name	Description
Denmark	Germansk Korpset, renamed the SS-Schalburgkorps	The Germanic Corps (Germansk Korpset) was established in April 1943 and renamed the SS-Schalburgkorps (Note: Christian Schalburg had originally commanded Danish volunteers to the Nazi cause as part of the Free Corps Denmark, but was killed in 1942. Schalburg had been an instructional officer in the Danish infantry before joining the Waffen-SS. Both he and his wife became close friends of the Danish royal family, especially the Danish prince, Gustav.) shortly afterwards. It was formed under the leadership of K.B. Martinsen who had recently returned to Denmark from the Eastern Front after the disbandment of the Free Corps Denmark (Freikorps Danmark), which he had latterly commanded as part of the Waffen-SS. It was divided into two parts. "Group I" acted as a uniformed paramilitary force, while "Group II" consisted of civilian sympathisers expected to fund the entity. The latter was transformed into a political party known as the Danish People's Defence (Dansk Folke Værn), which drew a number of existing factions of the Danish extreme-right away from the main National Socialist Workers' Party of Denmark (Danmarks Nationalsocialistiske Arbejderparti, or DNSAP). According to historian Martin Gutmann, this professional paramilitary group was "meant to replace the interned Danish army." By the winter of 1943, Martinsen had built up the unit to some 1,000 men commanded by two-dozen Danish Waffen-SS officers. Under plans devised by Himmler, Best, and Martinsen, the SS-Schalburgkorps was used to crush Danish resistance. It participated in the murder of opposition figures—including the Danish playwright, Kaj Munk—and bombed buildings with suspected links to Danish resistance.
Flanders (Belgium)	Algemeene SS Vlaanderen, renamed the Germaansche SS in Vlaanderen in October 1942	The General SS Flanders (Algemeene Schutscharen Vlaanderen, or Alg. SS-Vl.) was originally founded in November 1940 and was one of the first collaborationist formations to become part of the Germanische SS in October 1942. It was created as a political militia under the leadership of the radical flamingants René Lagrou and Ward Hermans. It included a reserve unit known as the Flanders Corps (Vlaanderen-Korps) and a short-lived youth movement called the Youth Front (Jeugdfront). Lagrou was killed on the Eastern Front while serving with the Flemish Legion in the Waffen-SS and Hermans emigrated to Germany to work in Nazi radio propaganda, meaning that leadership of the formation passed to Jozef De Langhe, Raf Van Hulse, and later Jef François. From 1943, it became associated with the radical political faction DeVlag, which sought to supplant the larger and more conservative Flemish National League (Vlaamsch Nationaal Verbond, VNV) as the principal collaborationist group in Flanders. Unofficially, Himmler wanted to use the organisation to penetrate occupied Belgium, which was under the control of a military administration run by the German Army rather than the Nazi Party or SS. It was also used to staff the anti-Jewish units of the German security services with auxiliary staff and provided guards for the prison camp at Fort Breendonk. It also published a newspaper entitled De SS Man. The group claimed only 3,499 members in January 1944 and more than half were serving in some capacity on the Eastern Front and the historian David Littlejohn estimates the number of its active members in Belgium at fewer than 400 by this point. Under the leadership of Stormbanleider Robert Verbelen, DeVlag and the SS-Vlaanderen collaborated in the killings of civilians and public figures in notional reprisals for attacks committed by the Belgian Resistance. According to historian Jan Craeybeckx, "their 1944 raid in the Hageland near Leuven left a trail of death and destruction" and "countless people were deported to concentration camps", notably from the small village of Meensel-Kiezegem which was attacked in August 1944. Alexandre Galopin, the incumbent governor of the Société Générale, was assassinated on Verbelen's orders in February 1944. As the Allies entered Belgium in September 1944, many of the perpetrators and collaborators fled to Germany.
Netherlands	Nederlandsche SS, renamed the Germaansche SS in Nederland in November 1942. (Note: Not only was there a Nederlandsche SS branch, Dutch historian Evertjan van Roekel also reports that there were between 22,000 and 25,000 men from the Netherlands who volunteered for service in the Waffen-SS, constituting the largest contingent amid "all the occupied countries of Western Europe.")	The Dutch SS (Nederlandsche SS) was formed in September 1940 under the auspices of Henk Feldmeijer within the main collaborationist party National Socialist Movement in the Netherlands (Nationaal-Socialistische Beweging in Nederland, NSB). Feldmeijer was a longstanding member of the party's radical Völkisch faction and envisaged the force as a kind of political police unit rather than a strictly military one. Its base was established at Avegoor, near Arnhem. The Dutch SS was increasingly subordinated to the SS which weakened its ties to the NSB. It became part of the Germanic SS in November 1942 and was renamed. It slowly gravitated away from the NSB's Dutch nationalism towards the idea of integrating the Netherlands in a Greater Germany. It published a newspaper entitled Storm and served an important role in facilitating recruitment for Dutch Waffen-SS units on the Eastern Front. In principle, there were six regiments (standaarden) based in Groningen, Arnhem, Amsterdam, the Hague, Eindhoven and Nijmegen. The movement claimed to have 6,127 members over the course of its existence but a large proportion at any given time were outside the Netherlands on the Eastern Front, meaning that all its units were likely to have been significantly understrength throughout its existence. Feldmeijer, who himself enlisted for service on the Eastern Front, participated in the killing of Dutch civilians in retaliation for attacks by the resistance in September 1943.
Norway	Norges SS, renamed the Germanske SS Norge in July 1942	The Norwegian SS (Norges SS) was established in May 1941 under the auspices of Jonas Lie, a career police officer who came from a notable family of writers who had recently returned to Norway after serving in the Balkans with the SS Nordland Regiment in the Waffen-SS. Sverre Riisnæs was Lie's second in command. Lie was inspired by the German Reichskommissar Josef Terboven and established the Norwegian SS without consulting Vidkun Quisling even though the formation remained notionally part of Quisling's National Union (Nasjonal Samling, or NS). It was separate from the NS's own Hird regiments although initially used its uniforms and structure. Heinrich Himmler personally attended the foundation ceremony for the Norwegian SS and continued to bestow favour of Lie, preventing Quisling from prohibiting the formation's establishment although he later forbade members of the Hird from participating. The establishment of the Norwegian Legion for its service on the Eastern Front in June 1941 led many members of the Norwegian SS to enlist and severely weakened it. As part of the SS's attempt to weaken Quisling's power, the Norwegian SS was renamed in July 1942 and brought into the Germanic SS. The organisation's membership reached a notional strength of 1,300 in 1944. A large part of the members were recruited from the police, and about 50 percent served in the Waffen-SS on the Eastern Front. It published a newspaper called Germaneren. Ultimately, it remained too small to represent a serious threat to Quisling's primacy in German-occupied Norway.

An underground Nazi organization also existed in Switzerland, known as the Germanische SS Schweiz. It had very few members and was considered merely a splinter Nazi group by Swiss authorities.

== Germanic battalions ==
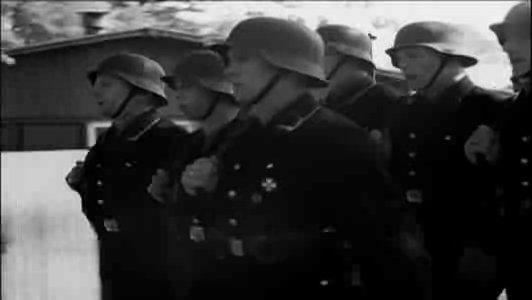
Danish members of the Schalburg Corps, filmed in 1944

Separately from the Germanic SS, a number of so-called Germanic Battalions (Germanische Sturmbanne) were established in September 1942 as part of the Allgemeine SS from among Flemish, Dutch, Norwegian, and Swiss expatriates and volunteer workers in Germany. A Danish unit in Berlin was disbanded in January 1943 amid a lack of personnel. In total, the total number of members was only 2,179 in March 1944.

== Post-war ==
After the war, many Germanic SS members were tried by their respective countries for treason. Independent war crimes trials outside the jurisdiction of the Nuremberg Trials were conducted in several European countries, such as in the Netherlands, Norway and Denmark, leading to several death sentences; an example being the commander of the Schalburg Corps, K.B. Martinsen. (Note: In total, forty-six Danes were executed by Danish courts, Martinsen and Flemming Helweg-Larsen among them.) In Norway, Lie committed suicide.

== See also ==
- Waffen-SS foreign volunteers and conscripts
- Pan-Germanism — a concept popularised before the First World War
- Nazi Party/Foreign Organization — the Nazi Party's foreign administration

== Bibliography ==
- Bauer, Yehuda (1982). A History of the Holocaust. New York: Franklin Watts. ISBN 9780531056417.
- Bloxham, Donald (2009). The Final Solution: A Genocide. New York: Oxford University Press. ISBN 978-0-19955-034-0.
- Bosworth, R. J. B. (2009). The Oxford Handbook of Fascism. Oxford and New York: Oxford University Press. ISBN 978-0-19-929131-1.
- Craeybeckx, Jan (2009). "Belgian and Flemish Fascism Before and During the Second World War". In Els Witte; Jan Craeybeckx; Alain Meynen (eds.). Political History of Belgium: From 1830 Onwards. Brussels: ASP. ISBN 978-9-05487-517-8.
- Emberland, Terje; Kott, Matthew (2012). Himmlers Norge. Nordmenn i det storgermanske prosjekt (in Norwegian). Oslo: Aschehoug. ISBN 978-82-03-29308-5.
- Fink, Jürg (1985). Die Schweiz aus der Sicht des Dritten Reiches, 1933-1945 (in German). Zürich: Schulthess. ISBN 3-7255-2430-0.
- Frijtag Drabbe Künzel, Geraldien von (2013). "Germanic Brothers: The Dutch and the Germanization of the Occupied East". In Anton Weiss-Wendt; Rory Yeomans (eds.). Racial Science in Hitler's New Europe, 1938–1945. Lincoln, NE: University of Nebraska Press. ISBN 978-0-80324-605-8.
- Gutmann, Martin R. (2017). Building a Nazi Europe: The SS's Germanic Volunteers. Cambridge and New York: Cambridge University Press. ISBN 978-1-10715-543-5.
- Hilberg, Raul (1992). Perpetrators, Victims, Bystanders: The Jewish Catastrophe, 1933–1945. New York: Harper Collins. ISBN 0-8419-0910-5.
- Höhne, Heinz (2001). The Order of the Death's Head: The Story of Hitler's SS. New York: Penguin Press. ISBN 978-0-14139-012-3.
- Littlejohn, David (1972). The Patriotic Traitors: A History of Collaboration in German-Occupied Europe, 1940–45. London: Heinemann. OCLC 463008186.
- McNab, Chris (2013). Hitler's Elite: The SS, 1939–45. Oxford and New York: Osprey. ISBN 978-1-78200-088-4.
- Mikhman, Dan (1998). Belgium and the Holocaust: Jews, Belgians, Germans. Oxford and New York: Berghahn Books. ISBN 978-965-308-068-3.
- Mineau, André (2011). SS Thinking and the Holocaust. New York: Editions Rodopi. ISBN 978-9401207829.
- Puschner, Uwe (2013). "The Notions Völkisch and Nordic: A Conceptual Approximation". In Horst Junginger; Andreas Åkerlund (eds.). Nordic Ideology between Religion and Scholarship. Frankfurt am Main: Peter Lang GmbH. ISBN 978-3-63164-487-4.
- Roekel, Evertjan van (2018). "The Netherlands". In David Stahel (ed.). Joining Hitler's Crusade: European Nations and the Invasion of the Soviet Union, 1941. Cambridge and New York: Cambridge University Press. ISBN 978-1-31651-034-6.
- Shirer, William (1990). The Rise and Fall of the Third Reich. New York: MJF Books. ISBN 978-1-56731-163-1.
- Sørensen, Øystein (1995). "Germanske SS Norge (GSSN)". In Hans Fredrik Dahl; Guri Hjeltnes; Berit Nøkleby; Nils Johan Ringdal; Øystein Sørensen (eds.). Norsk krigsleksikon, 1940–1945 (in Norwegian). Oslo: Cappelen. ISBN 82-02-14138-9.
- Weale, Adrian (2012). Army of Evil: A History of the SS. New York: Caliber Printing. ISBN 978-0-451-23791-0.
