= Christian Peder Kryssing =

Danish collaborator with Nazi Germany, artillery officer and anti-communist

Christian Peter Kryssing
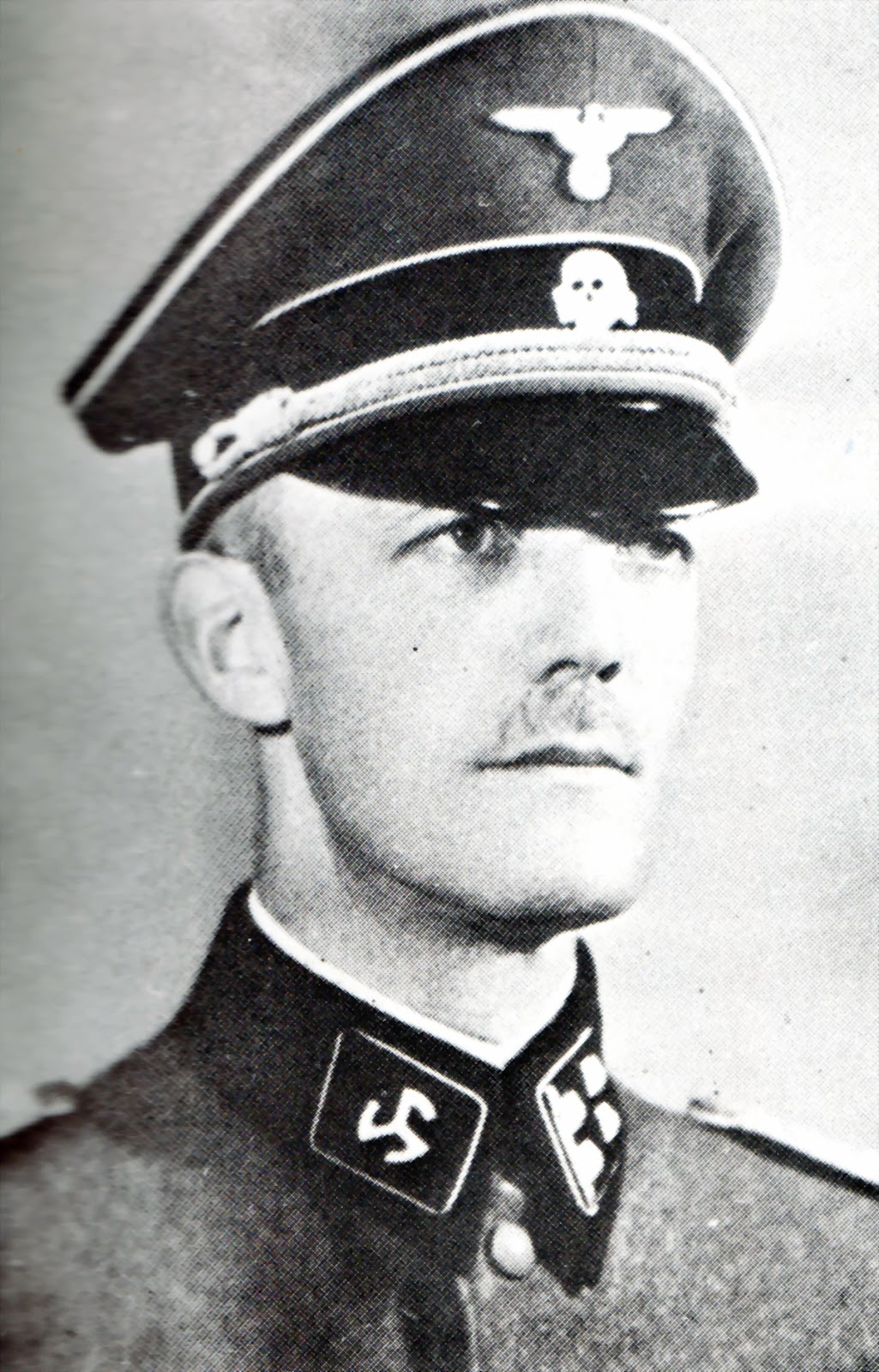
- Nickname: Christos
- Born: July 7, 1891; Kolding, Denmark
- Died: July 7, 1976 (aged 85) Haderslev, Denmark
- Allegiance: Denmark; Nazi Germany
- Service years: 1910–1945
- Rank: SS-Brigadeführer and Generalmajor of the Waffen-SS
- Commands: Free Corps Denmark; SS-Kampfgruppe Küste

Christian Peder Kryssing (July 7, 1891 – July 7, 1976), commonly known as C.P. Kryssing, was a Danish collaborator with Nazi Germany during World War II. An artillery officer and an ardent anti-communist, he commanded the Free Corps Denmark from 1941 to 1942. He was not a member of the National Socialist Workers' Party of Denmark.

== Military career ==
Kryssing became the first commander of the Free Corps Denmark in 1941 after being offered the position by the Danish Nazi Party. By August 1941, Kryssing built up a battalion strength of 1,000 men with many of its members hailing from the ranks of the defeated Danish Army. However, due to ideological differences with Heinrich Himmler, he was discharged as commander in 1942. His replacement was a pro-National Socialist Dane, Christian Frederik von Schalburg who took over command on 13 February, 1942.

Kryssing was then transferred to other German units, first the SS Division Totenkopf and later the 5th SS Division Wiking. In August 1943, he was appointed to lead the 9,000 strong "Coastal Battlegroup" at Oranienbaum. During this time, he became the highest ranked foreigner in Waffen-SS as a SS-Brigadeführer. In February 1944, Kryssing became commander of SS-Kampfgruppe Küste but resigned in June the same year because of personal issues.

In May 1945 Kryssing surrendered to the British forces and was handed over to the Danish Police in June 1946. On October 27, 1947, he was sentenced to four years’ imprisonment for his membership of Waffen-SS but was released in May 1948. His two sons, Jens Effersøe Kryssing and Niels John Effersøe Kryssing, had been killed in battle against the Red Army in 1942 and 1944.

== See also ==
- List of SS-Brigadeführer
