= Mehlhorn =

Mehlhorn is a surname. Notable people with the surname include:

- Annika Mehlhorn, German swimmer
- Bill Mehlhorn, American golfer
- Hans Mehlhorn, German bobsledder
- Herbert Mehlhorn
- Kurt Mehlhorn
- Ludwig Mehlhorn, German mathematician
- Ulf Mehlhorn, German footballer
