= Wilhelm Albert (SS officer) =

German SS officer

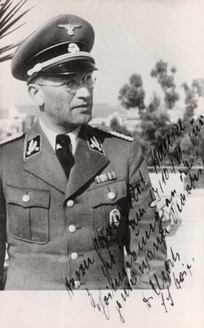
Wilhelm Albert (SS officer)

Karl Wilhelm Albert (8 September 1898 in Hessenthal– 21 April 1960 in Erndtebrück) was a German SS officer.

== Biography ==
Albert was the son of a teacher. After his primary and secondary studies, he fought in the First World War as a soldier. Later he participated in battles fought by the Freikorps. He trained as an electrical engineer and earned his Doktoringenieur.

Albert joined the NSDAP on 1 May 1932 (no. 1,122,215) and the SS on 1 August 1932 (no. 36,189), and began working for the Sicherheitsdienst (SD), the intelligence service of the SS.

In autumn 1933, as an SS-Sturmführer, Albert was entrusted with the direction of the SD-Oberabschnitt West section of the SD, located in Düsseldorf, and later the Oberabschnitt Rhein section, located in Frankfurt. In 1935, he succeeded Werner Best as the chief of staff and the organization of the central administration of the SD.

After the reorganization of the SD in January 1936, Albert took over the management of one of its three bureaus, the newly created Amt I (Administration). This promotion made him one of the five leaders highest in the hierarchy, along with Reinhard Heydrich, Werner Best, Heinz Jost and Franz Six. After the founding of the SS-Reichssicherheitshauptamt (RSHA), Albert took over the Central Section I (staff, administration, organization).

In April 1939, Albert was promoted to SS-Brigadeführer. In 1939, he was appointed along with Werner Best, Walter Schellenberg and Kurt Pomme as director of the Stiftung Nordhav.

During World War II, Albert was chief of police in Litzmannstadt (Łódź). After his replacement in 1944, he became the successor to the district president Hans Burkhardt in the district Hohensalza in Reichsgau Wartheland.

After the war, Albert was interned until 1947. He was never heard in the Federal Republic of Germany in connection with Nazi crimes until his death.

== Bibliography ==
- Shlomo Aronson: Reinhard Heydrich und die Frühgeschichte von Gestapo und SD, 1967.
- George C. Browder: "Die Anfänge des SD. Dokumente aus der Organisationsgeschichte des Sicherheitsdienstes des Reichsführers SS", in: Vierteljahrshefte für Zeitgeschichte 27 (1979), p. 299-324.
- Ernst Klee: Das Personenlexikon zum Dritten Reich. Fischer, Frankfurt am Main 2007. ISBN 978-3-596-16048-8. (second edition, updated)
