= Hilfspolizei =

Nazi auxiliary police force established in 1933

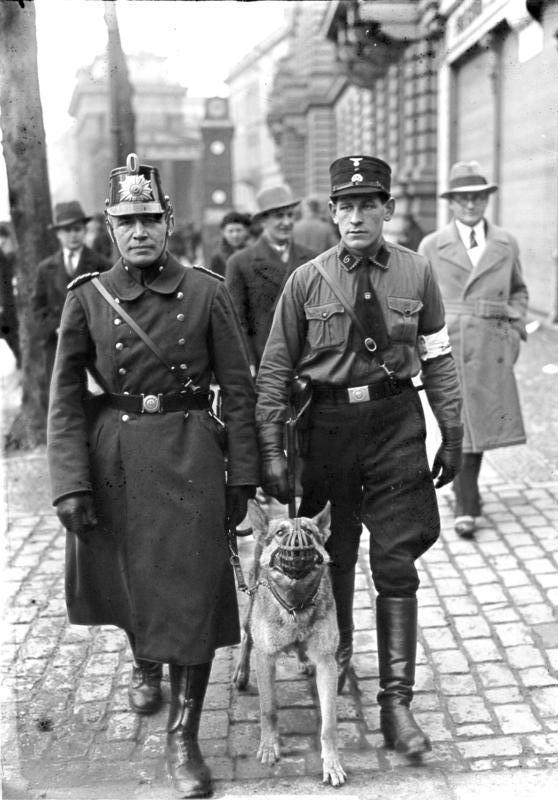
Members of Schutzpolizei (left) and Hilfspolizei (right) patrol Berlin on 5 March 1933, the day of the Reichstag election

The Hilfspolizei (HiPo or Hipo; meaning "auxiliary police") was a short-lived auxiliary police force in Nazi Germany in 1933. The term was later semi-officially used for various auxiliary organizations subordinated to the Ordnungspolizei as well as various military and paramilitary units set up during World War II in German-occupied Europe.

== Hipo 1933 ==
Hermann Göring, newly appointed as Interior Minister of Prussia, established the Hilfspolizei on 22 February 1933 to assist regular police in maintaining order and later in handling communists in the wake of the Reichstag fire. The organization quickly spread from Prussia to other German states and Hitler endorsed it in the Reichstag Fire Decree. The units were staffed mainly by members of Sturmabteilung (SA) and Allgemeine SS wearing SA or SS uniforms with a white brassard. It is estimated that the auxiliary units had 25,000 SA and 15,000 SS members. The units also included members of the Der Stahlhelm veterans' organization. The force carried out or organized numerous violent attacks against Nazi opponents and staffed the early Columbia and Dachau concentration camps. The SS-Totenkopfverbände grew out of this formation. The force was disbanded in August 1933 due to international protests that the units violated the disarmament provisions of the Treaty of Versailles, Adolf Hitler's growing distrust of SA, and outliving its purpose during the consolidation of the new Nazi régime.

== Hipo during the war ==
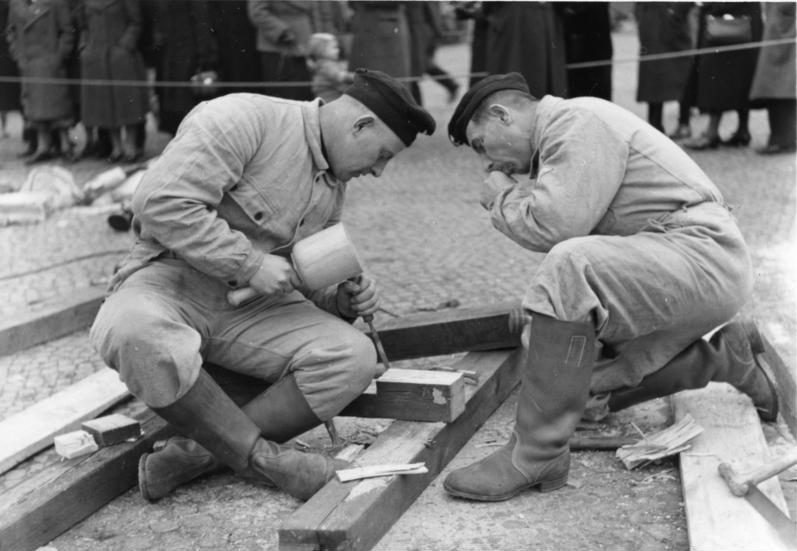
Members of TeNo during a demonstration for the general public in 1939.

=== Technical Hipo ===
- Air raid protection police (Luftschutzpolizei) was the civil protection service in charge of air raid defence and rescue victims of bombings in connection with the Technische Nothilfe (Technical Emergency Service) and the Feuerschutzpolizei (professional fire departments). Created as the Security and Assistance Service (Sicherheits und Hilfsdienst) in 1935, it was renamed Luftschutzpolizei in April 1942. The air raid network was supported by the Reichsluftschutzbund (Reich Association for Air Raid Precautions), an organization controlled from 1935 by the Air Ministry under Hermann Göring. The RLB set up an organization of air raid wardens who were responsible for the safety of a building or a group of houses.
- Technical Emergency Corps (Technische Nothilfe; TeNo) was a corps of engineers, technicians and specialists in construction work. The TeNo was created in 1919 to keep the public utilities and essential industries running during the wave of strikes. From 1937, the TeNo became a technical auxiliary corps of the police and was absorbed into Orpo Hauptamt. By 1943, the TeNo had over 100,000 members.
- Feuerwehren, volunteer fire departments, conscripted fire departments, and industrial fire departments were auxiliary police subordinate to the Ordnungspolizei. They carried firearms at all times.

=== Special Hipo ===
- Radio protection (Funkschutz) was made up of SS and Orpo security personnel assigned to protect German broadcasting stations from attack and sabotage. The Funkschutz was also the primary investigating service which detected illegal reception of foreign radio broadcasts.
- Postschutz (Postal protection) comprised roughly 45,000 members (including mailmen) and was tasked with the security of Germany's Reichspost, which was responsible not only for the mail but other communications media such as the telephone and telegraph systems. All were issued firearms.
- SS-Bahnschutz replaced the Railway police within the Reich territory from 1944.
- Factory protection police (Werkschutzpolizei) were the security guards of Nazi Germany. Its personnel were civilians employed by industrial enterprises, and typically were issued paramilitary uniforms and firearms.
- Urban and rural emergency police (Stadt- und Landwacht) created in 1942 as a part-time police reserve. Abolished in 1945 with the creation of the Volkssturm.

== Hipo in occupied Europe ==
The term Hilfspolizei was also used for various military and paramilitary units set up during World War II in German-occupied Europe. In this context, the term often labels groups of local collaborators with the Nazi régime, such as the HIPO Corps in Denmark, various Schutzmannschaft units, Selbstschutz, etc.
