= Boxheim Documents =

1931 plans for a Nazi coup

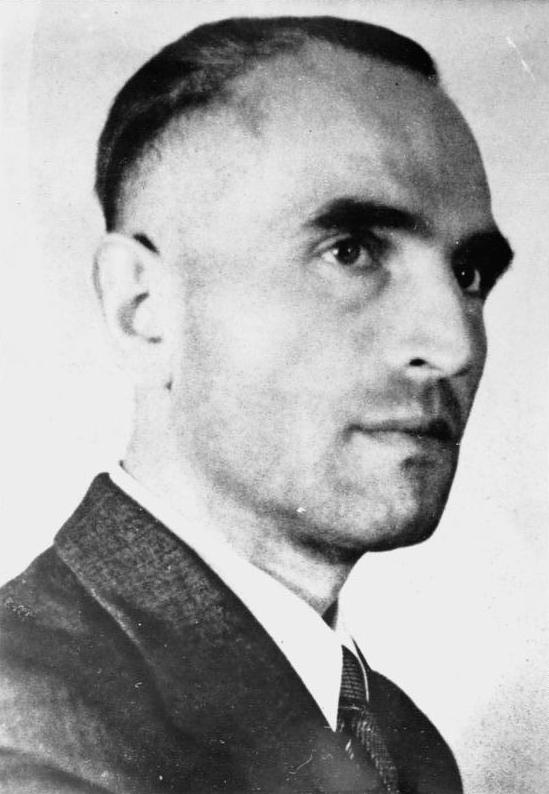
Werner Best in 1942

The Boxheim Documents were coup plans drawn up on August 5, 1931, by judge and Nazi Party member Werner Best.

Their name refers to the Boxheim farm in Lampertheim near Darmstadt in Hesse, where members of the leading bodies of the Hessian Nazi Party met several times in the summer of 1931. The publication of the document in the autumn of 1931 caused considerable controversy.

== Background ==
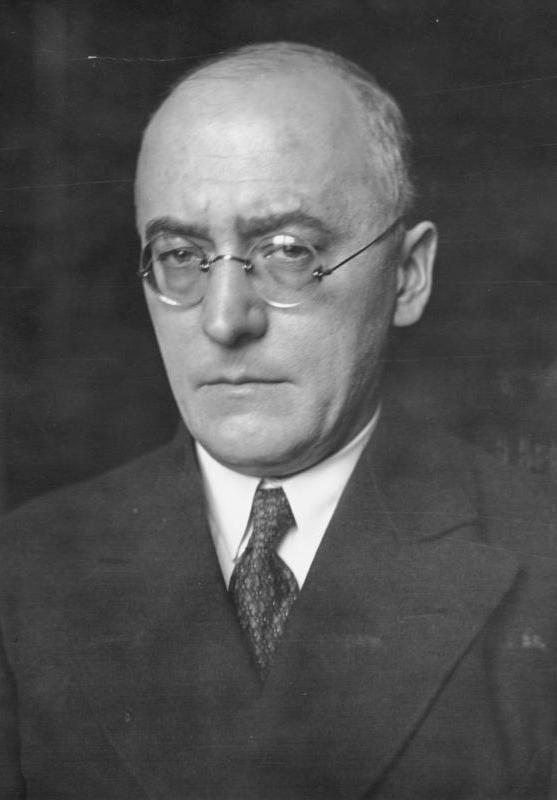
Heinrich Brüning, Reich Chancellor from 1930 to 1932

In the autumn of 1931, Reich Chancellor Heinrich Brüning (Zentrum) governed the Weimar Republic mainly by ordinances, under Article 48 of the Weimar Constitution. Under pressure from Reich President Paul von Hindenburg, the Chancellor formed a new cabinet on October 10, 1931.

The NSDAP and the Stahlhelm, a paramilitary veterans' organisation, immediately organised major demonstrations. Brüning then began working with the NSDAP in anticipation of the 1932 German presidential election. The project of taming the NSDAP was the brainchild of Interior Minister Wilhelm Groener and Kurt von Schleicher. However, this aim was viable only if Hitler kept his political action within a legal framework, as he had committed himself to doing at the end of September 1930.

SPD politician Carl Severing and the Hesse Interior Minister Wilhelm Leuschner opposed this policy of taming the NSDAP and wanted to prosecute the party for high treason and to ban it.

== Publication of the documents ==
Werner Best initially communicated his plans in August and September 1931 to the Hessian NSDAP and the national party bodies. However, they attracted little interest, and Rudolf Hess dismisses these as a "young fool's joke". (Note: Dummejungenstreich)

The publication of the documents came at a later stage. Wilhelm Schäfer, who had taken part in several meetings at the Boxheim farm, had gradually distanced himself from the NSDAP.

Werner Best had forced him to resign as a member of the Landtag because Schäfer had provided an inaccurate curriculum vitae to the Party, and Best's apartment was searched by SA members. Schäfer left the Nazi Party and handed over the Boxheim Documents to the Frankfurt police on November 25, 1931.

Best was suspended from state service and high treason proceedings were opened against him. Leuschner unsuccessfully asked for a public trial because he hoped that it would reveal the NSDAP's violent aims of seizing power. On October 12, 1932, Best was acquitted by the court, which alleged a lack of evidence. Best had consistently stated in court that the National Socialists would only intervene in the first event of a communist coup.

Schäfer's information provided Leuschner with a way to prove the illegal nature of the NSDAP. On November 25, he ordered several searches and arrest warrants for suspect NSDAP members in Darmstadt, which provided evidence about the veracity of the documents. Leuschner then passed this evidence to the press. Schäfer was shot dead in July 1933. Best, accused of the murder, was acquitted in 1950.

== Content ==
The originals of the Boxheim Documents are not accessible and have been in a Moscow archive since the end of World War II. Werner Best himself released a self-published version in May 1932, accompanied by supporting comments. The most commonly used version is based on a publication made in 1953 by the weekly Das Parlament.

Boxheimer Dokumente

The previous holders of state power, both in the Reich and in the country, have ceased to exist as a result of the events of the last few days (weeks). This actual change has created a new legal situation, as in November 1918. The power to regulate currently rests solely with the . . . (SA, Landeswehren, etc.). Their leadership therefore has the right and the duty to seize and exercise the orphaned state power in order to save the people. It does this in the name of the German nation, for whose future alone it is responsible for the fulfillment of its task and for the choice of its means.

Die seitherigen Träger der Staatsgewalt, im Reiche wie im Lande, sind durch die Ereignisse der letzten Tage (Wochen) weggefallen. Durch diese tatsächliche Veränderung ist wie im November 1918 ein neuer Rechtszustand geschaffen. Ordnende Macht steht zur Zeit allein bei den . . . (SA., Landeswehren o. ä.). Ihre Führung hat deshalb das Recht und die Pflicht, zur Rettung des Volkes die verwaiste Staatsgewalt zu ergreifen und auszuüben. Sie tut dies im Namen der deutschen Nation, vor deren Zukunft allein sie für die Erfüllung ihrer Aufgabe und für die Wahl ihrer Mittel verantwortlich ist.

— Werner Best, Boxheimer Dokumente

The Boxheim documents contain several draft decrees, as well as a draft of an appeal to the population, in the event of a conquest of power. Their title reads: "Draft of the first declaration of our leadership following the fall of state authorities, for the victory over communism, for a region united in a single administration." (Note: Entwurf der ersten Bekanntmachung unserer Führung nach dem Wegfall der seitherigen obersten Staatsbehörden und nach Überwindung der Kommune in einem für einheitliche Verwaltung geeigneten Gebiet.) Best hypothesizes a communist revolt against the government. He compares it to the November Revolution, and says it would bring about "a new state of law.". (Note: einen neuen Rechtszustand) The SA would then take the reins of the state: "Instead of the highest state authorities (ministries), there are the leaders of the... (SA, Landwehren, etc.) that I represent." (Note: An die Stelle der obersten Staatsbehörden (Ministerien) tritt die Führung der … (SA, Landwehren o.ä.) vertreten durch mich.)

For the sake of the people, armed Nazi groups would have to seize power and declare a state of emergency. These groups would exercise unlimited executive power. All political opponents would be imprisoned "preventively" and immediately in concentration camps that would be quickly set up: "The principle is to punish resistance with death", (Note: Widerstand wird grundsätzlich mit dem Tode bestraft) including any disobedience to the new decrees resulting from the coup. Anyone who does not hand over the weapons in their possession within 24 hours will be shot, as will public officials who go on strike or commit sabotage.

Courts-martial would have to be set up "to avoid the appearance of arbitrariness."

In addition, the project provided for extensive expropriations. All food stocks should be recorded on lists and delivered on demand: "any sale or exchange of food shall be prohibited." (Note: jeder Verkauf und jede tauschweise Veräußerung von Lebensmitteln ist verboten) A moratorium on interest and rent payments and on property seizures, which had become very common during the crisis of 1929, would be introduced and a fundamental right of access by the state to all private property would be introduced: "until there is a regulation to the contrary, there will be no more private income." (Note: Es gibt bis zur anderweitigen Regelung kein Privateinkommen mehr) In addition, a general compulsory work service should be introduced for all Germans over the age of 16: "The right to food... depends on the fulfilment of the service obligation". (Note: Der Anspruch auf Ernährung … ist von der Erfüllung der Dienstpflicht abhängig.) Since Jews were excluded from labor service, this implicitly meant that they would not receive any food ration.

Best's formulations have parallels with the draft emergency constitution he was familiar with and which Theodor von der Pfordten, shot dead by police during the Beer Hall Putsch, had drafted in 1923.

== Reactions ==
The government tried to present the case less dramatically: the day after the documents were published, Chief Reich Prosecutor Karl Werner declared that the violent measures contained in the plan were in no way directed at the current government, but at the possibility of a communist uprising, and stressed that he himself had not ordered the searches. Brüning states in his memoirs that he had encouraged Werner to downplay the affair. The Reich Ministry of Justice also took the view that the offence of high treason was not established on the basis of the documents, since it presupposes the intention to overthrow the government by violence, and that did not apply in the case of a communist putsch.

The NSDAP party press initially reported that the documents were forgeries. Hermann Göring, commissioned by Hitler, hastened on November 27 to reassure Groener, indicating that Best's plans had no connection with the party leadership, which "remains as before, and as he has expressed and sworn quite often, in the strictest course of legality." Hitler, who in private spoke friendly with Best and jokingly called him "bird of ill omen", (Note: Unglücksraben) however, clearly distanced himself from him in an interview with the foreign press on December 4. In particular, he declared, in view of the 1932 presidential election, "a party which can count on 15 million voters really has no need to undertake illegal action." (Note: Eine Partei, die mit 15 Millionen rechnen könne, habe es gar nicht erst nötig, einen illegalen Schritt zu unternehmen.) The party members who had taken part in the Boxheim discussions were all provisionally suspended, and an internal investigation was conducted by Hans Frank without any results. On December 9, however, Hitler deemed it necessary to prohibit any discussion of the forms and modalities of a Nazi seizure of power, an offence punishable by expulsion from the party.

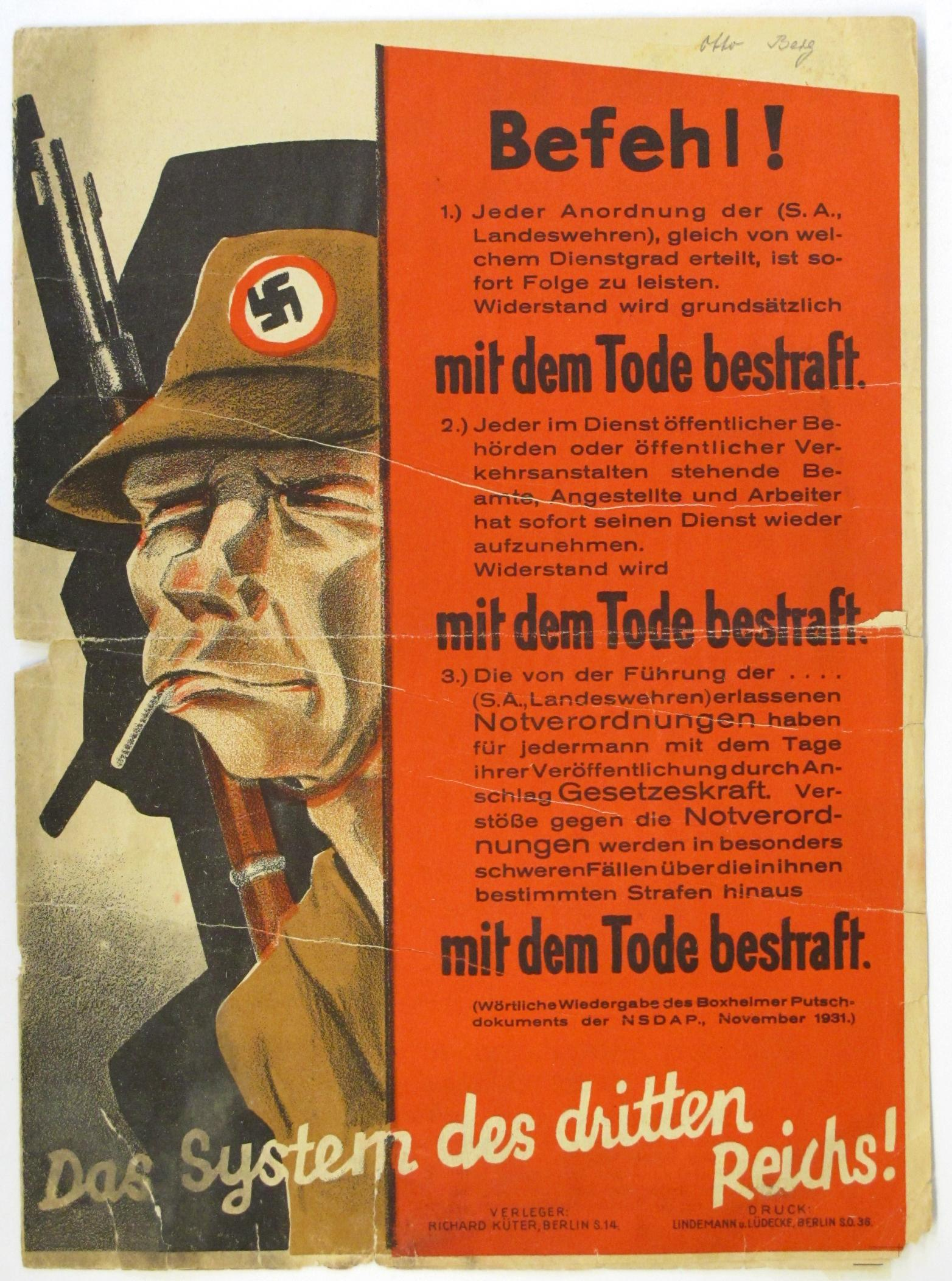
SPD election poster for the 1932 Prussian state election using quotes from the Boxheim Documents to attack the NSDAP

Hesse's bloody plans

For these people, governing means shooting other people. Their imagination is filled with scenes of executions. The lust for power is, for them, synonymous with the lust for murder.

Regieren heißt für diese Leute, andere erschießen zu lassen. Ihre Phantasie ist ausgefüllt mit Hinrichtungsszenen, Lust an Macht ist für sie gleichbedeutend mit Lust an Mord.

— Wilhelm Leuschner, Vorwärts

The publication of the documents provoked widespread protest in Germany, from the Communist press to the conservative one. Demands were made for the author of these plans to be brought before the Reichsgericht for high treason.

The social-democratic newspaper Vorwärts commented on 26 November 1931 in an article entitled "Hesse's bloody plans" (Note: Die Blutpläne von Hessen) how it showed the fundamentally brutal nature of the Nazi Party.

Carl von Ossietzky, editor of Weltbühne, called the documents "the executioner's fantasies of a Hessian judge", (Note: Henkersphantasie eines hessischen Gerichtsassessors) with which "the street would be handed over to the hooligans and the SA's army of cutthroats, which would bloodily suppress any opposition, immediately labelled a Commune." (Note: die Straße der Hooligan- und Halsabschneiderarmee der SA-Kommandeure ausgeliefert [würde], die jede Opposition als ’Kommune’ blutig unterdrücken)

The lead editorial of Germania, a Zentrum newspaper, concluded that "the crucial question goes beyond that of legality or illegality, the crucial question is whether the national leadership of the Nazi Party tolerates or even approves the discussion and preparation of such insane methods of government by important party leaders" and asked that Best shall be expelled from the NSDAP. The Hessian Center Party publicly rejected most of the Nazis' conditions for a coalition on December 11, asking them to renounce armed force.

On the other hand, the German National Breisgauer Zeitung downplayed the incident, writing that "a racket about high treason was artificially staged against the Right" and that the NSDAP was simply oblivious to the events in Hesse, commenting "Something as immature as this playing around with dictatorship is absolutely inconceivable."

British chargé d'affaires in Berlin Sir Basil Newton informed the Foreign Office that the Nazi movement was planning a dangerous revolutionary takeover. French ambassador André François-Poncet hoped that the scandal resulting from the revelation of these documents would put an end to the dangerous policy of taming the NSDAP, but he doubted that it would be the case. He summed up the situation on December 3 to Foreign Minister Aristide Briand: "The Boxheim affair has complicated, worsened and strained the state of affairs in Germany. It is an additional element that contributes to the impotence and widespread fear." (Note: L'affaire de Boxheim a compliqué, empiré et tendu l'état des choses en Allemagne. Elle est un élément supplémentaire qui contribue à l'impuissance et à la peur généralisée)

== Historiography ==
Karl Dietrich Bracher, in a 1955 study, considered Best's sketches to be good evidence of the "radically totalitarian position" of the lower members of the Nazi Party, who disavowed the leadership's policy of legality as opportunistic.

Erich Eyck indicated in 1959 that the Boxheim documents were indeed an act of high treason, and that Best's argument before the court was based on an assumed cynicism.

For Heinrich August Winkler, the interest of the Boxheim Documents lies not so much in their programmatic virtue, but in the reaction they provoked in the bourgeois elites of the Weimar Republic. He compares the "nonchalance" displayed by the public prosecutor's office and the Reich government to the zeal with which they pursued critics from the left and concludes: "The treatment of the Boxheim documents showed to what extent sections of the judiciary and the high bureaucracy had already sided with the final victory of National Socialism long before Hitler's actual seizure of power."

Christian Striefler agrees with Best's argument and regards the documents as a mere "preventative reflection on the behavior to adopt in the event of an actual communist takeover," which many Nazis believed would allow them to "achieve their goal more quickly.".

Best's biographer Ulrich Herbert, on the other hand, believes that the scenario of a leftist putsch outlined in the documents is only a ploy, which "gives the fantasies of violence of the right a garment of legality, by making dictatorship a defensive measure, and by associating brutal and radical action with the conservation of the forms of law.".

== See also ==
- "Boxheimer Dokumente". dfg-vk-darmstadt.de.
