= Stiftung Nordhav =

Front organisation for the SS involved in acquiring real estate

- Founded: 1939
- Founder: Reinhard Heydrich
- Dissolved: 1945
- Purpose: real estate acquisition for SS and Security Police rest and relaxation centers
- Location: Prinz Albrecht Straße 8, Berlin, Germany
- Region served: Germany
- Method: money stolen from disenfranchised and murdered Jews
- Key people: Reinhard Heydrich, Wilhelm Albert, Herbert Mehlhorn, Werner Best, Kurt Pomme and Walter Schellenberg

The Stiftung Nordhav (Nordhav-Stiftung or Nordhav Foundation) was a front organization of the Sicherheitsdienst (SD) founded in 1939 by Reinhard Heydrich to obtain and manage real estate for the Schutzstaffel (SS).

== Founding and purpose ==
The name Nordhav came from an old Germanic term for the North Sea. Heydrich established the Stiftung Nordhav on 30 July 1939. The State Secretary Wilhelm Stuckart recognized the foundation 3 August 1939. The foundation's official purpose was to obtain real estate to be used as rest and recreation centers for members of the SS, Reich Security Police, and their families. Besides this official function, Heydrich intended to make use of the organization to acquire real property for himself. Heydrich named five directors: Karl Wilhelm Albert, Herbert Mehlhorn, Werner Best, Kurt Pomme, and Walter Schellenberg. The initial foundation endowment was 150,000 reichsmarks.

== First acquisition ==
The first foundation acquisition was the Katharinenhof, a farm on Fehmarn, a Baltic Sea island and vacation spot. Heydrich intended to use this property as a vacation home, in addition to the Fehmarn summer home he already owned. The 11-hectare Katharinenhof had its own beachfront, archaeologically significant Stone Age graves, a beach house with a thatched roof, and stables. Schellenberg handled the entire transaction. The outbreak of World War II in Europe on 1 September 1939 caused the foundation to become inactive for the next six months.

== Wannsee Villa ==
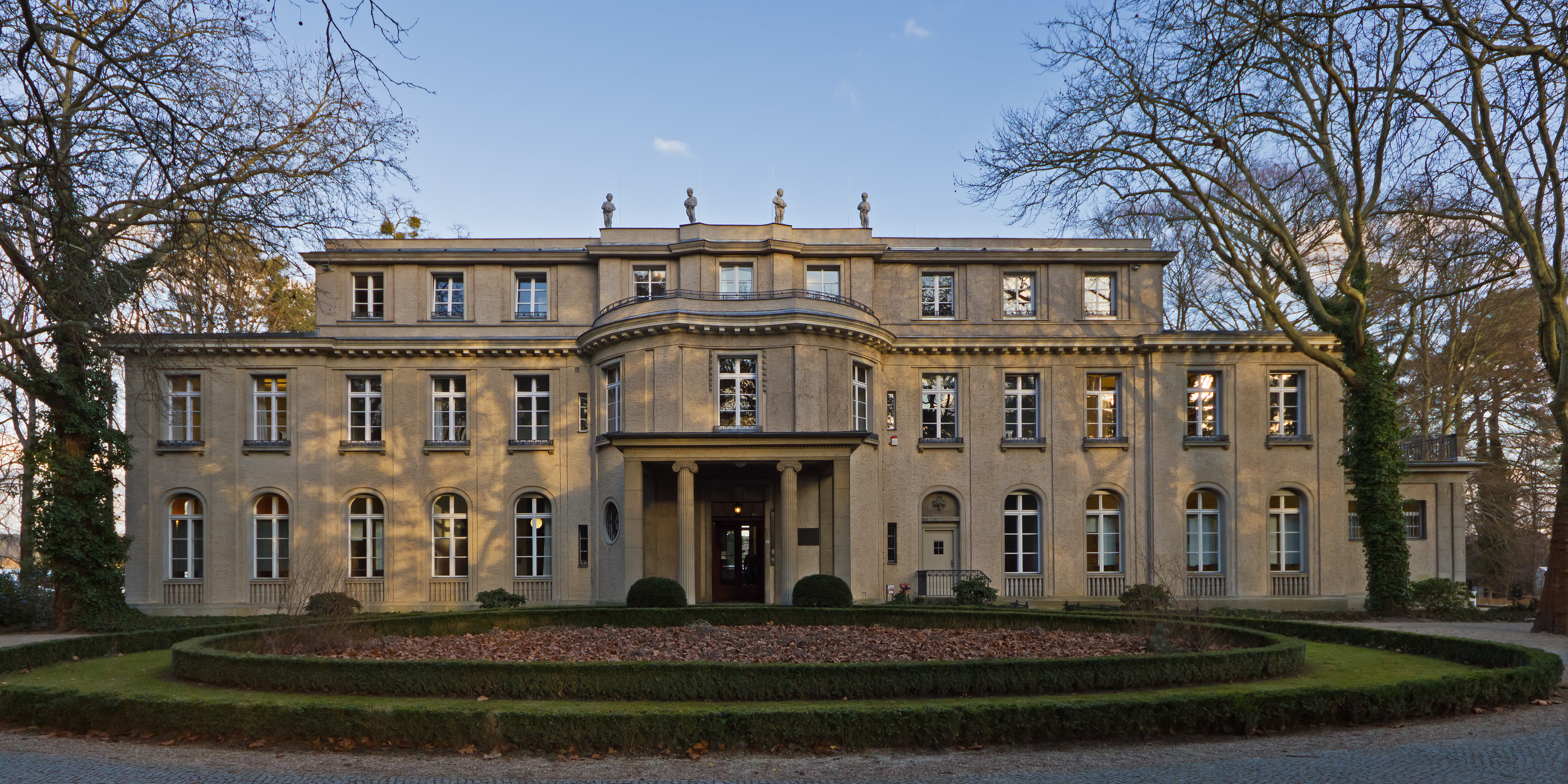
The villa at 56–58 Am Großen Wannsee, where the Wannsee Conference was held, now a memorial and museum

The most important financial transaction of the Stiftung Nordhav occurred in November 1940: the acquisition of the Wannsee Villa at Am Grossen Wannsee 56–58, in Berlin. The industrialist Friedrich Minoux, owner of the villa, had been jailed for defrauding the Berlin Gasworks, the largest financial crime of the Nazi era. From his jail cell in Berlin, Minoux sold the villa to the Stiftung Nordhav for 1.95 million reichsmarks. Heydrich's intention was to use the villa as an SS guesthouse and vacation lodging, with part reserved for his own needs. On 20 January 1942, the Wannsee Villa became the venue for the Wannsee Conference, the meeting Heydrich held with senior officials of the Nazi regime to announce the plans for the deportation and extermination of all Jews in German-occupied territory. This action was to be coordinated with the representatives from the Nazi state agencies present at the meeting.

== Post war ==
The Wannsee Villa is today a Holocaust memorial. The Katharinenhof is a museum and camping spot.
