= Deportation of the Danish police =

During the Nazi occupation in World War II

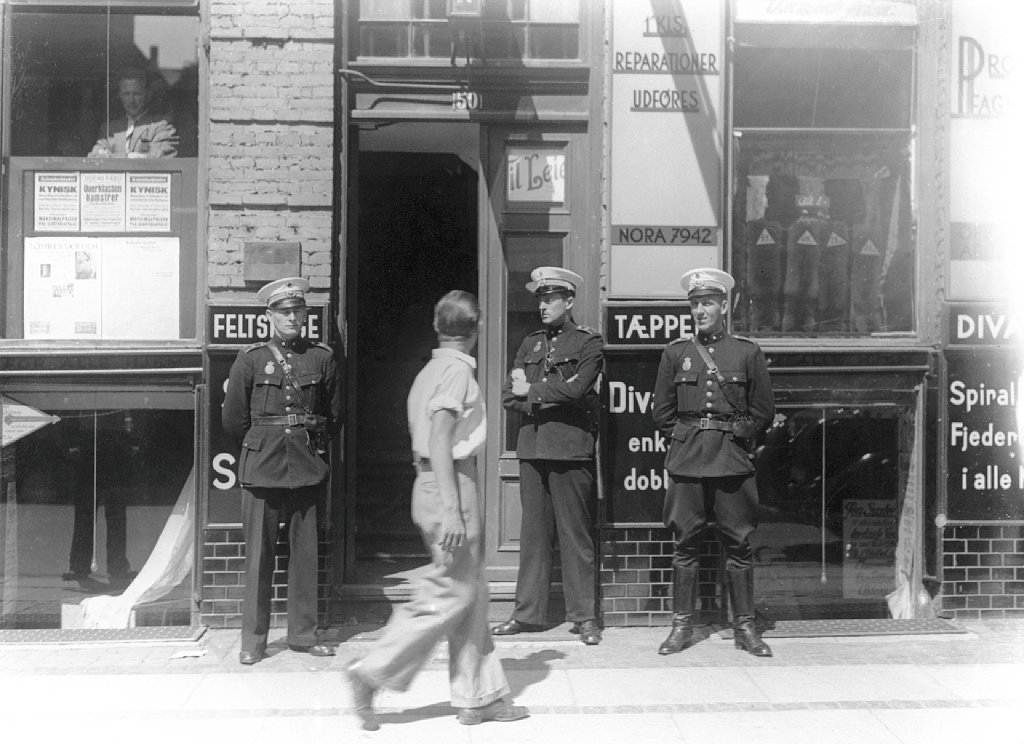
Danish Police officers in Copenhagen, 1941.

During World War II, the Danish government chose to cooperate with the Nazi occupation authorities. Even though this applied to the Danish police as well, many were reluctant to cooperate. As a result, a large number of members of the Danish police force were deported to Nazi concentration camps in Germany. The Gestapo established the collaborationist HIPO Corps to replace them.

== April 1940–September 1944 ==
Nazi Germany occupied Denmark on 9 April 1940, and the Danish cabinet decided on a policy of collaboration. This applied to all civil servants, including the entire Danish police force, which began cooperation with its German counterparts.

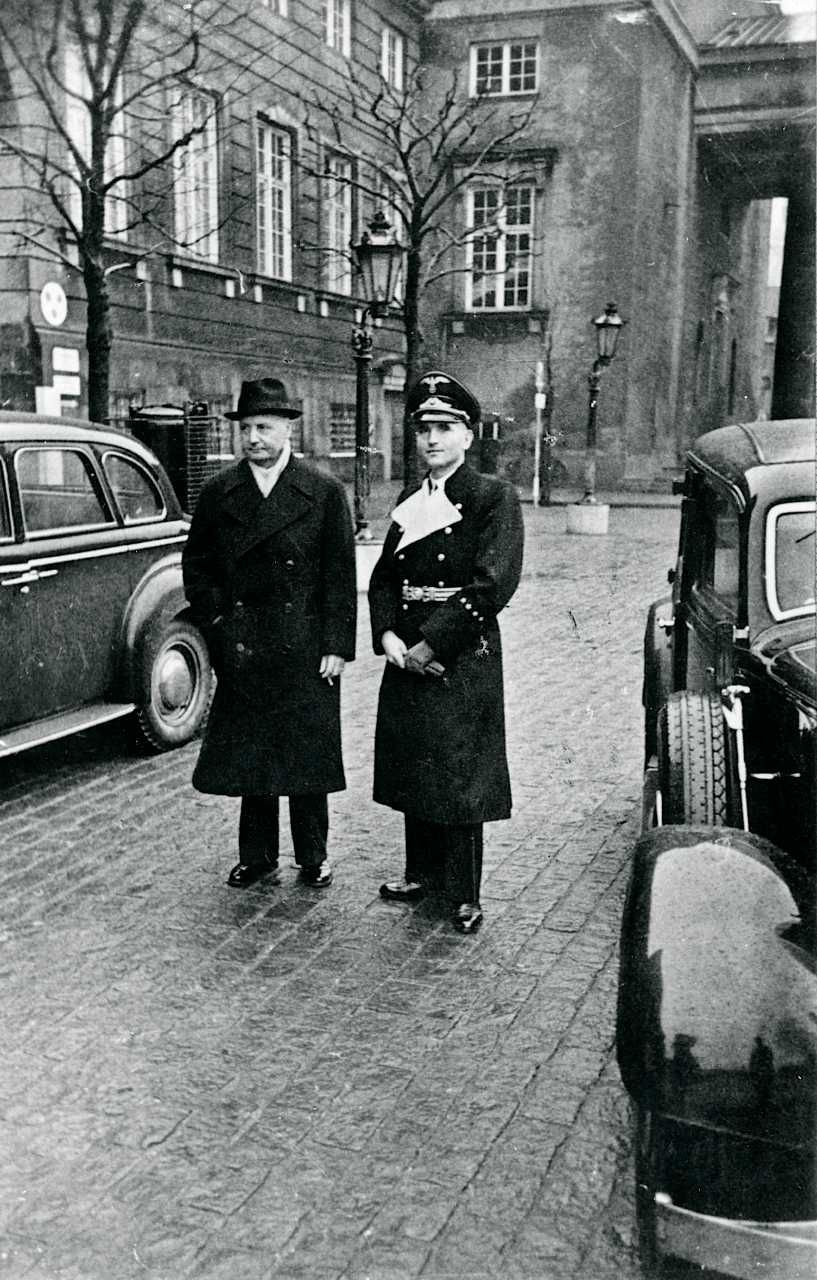
Best (right) with Erik Scavenius, Danish PM 1942-43.

On 12 May 1944, Dr. Werner Best demanded that the Danish police should protect 57 specific enterprises against sabotage from the Danish resistance movement, which was growing in strength. Should the Danish civil service not accept this, the Danish police force would be reduced from 10,000 to 3,000 men. The head of the Danish administration, Nils Svenningsen, was inclined to accept this demand, but the organizations of the Danish police were opposed to the idea. The German request was ultimately turned down, and this was reported to Best on 6 June 1944. This reduced the Gestapo's already limited trust in the Danish police even further.

== Arrest and deportation ==
The German army began arresting members of the Danish police in Denmark's main cities on 19 September 1944. The force numbered 10,000 men in that year. 1,960 personnel were arrested and later deported to the Neuengamme concentration camp. Policemen deported to Buchenwald were in two groups, the first group was sent on 29 September, the second was transferred on 5 October 1944. On 16 December, following pressure from the Danish administration, 1604 men were transferred from Buchenwald to Mühlberg (Stammlager or Stalag IV-B), a camp for prisoners of war POWs. That meant an improvement in the situation for the Danish policemen; POWs had some kind of protection due to international conventions, while inmates in concentration camps did not.

Subsequently the policemen were scattered somewhat on various work details.

== Negotiations ==
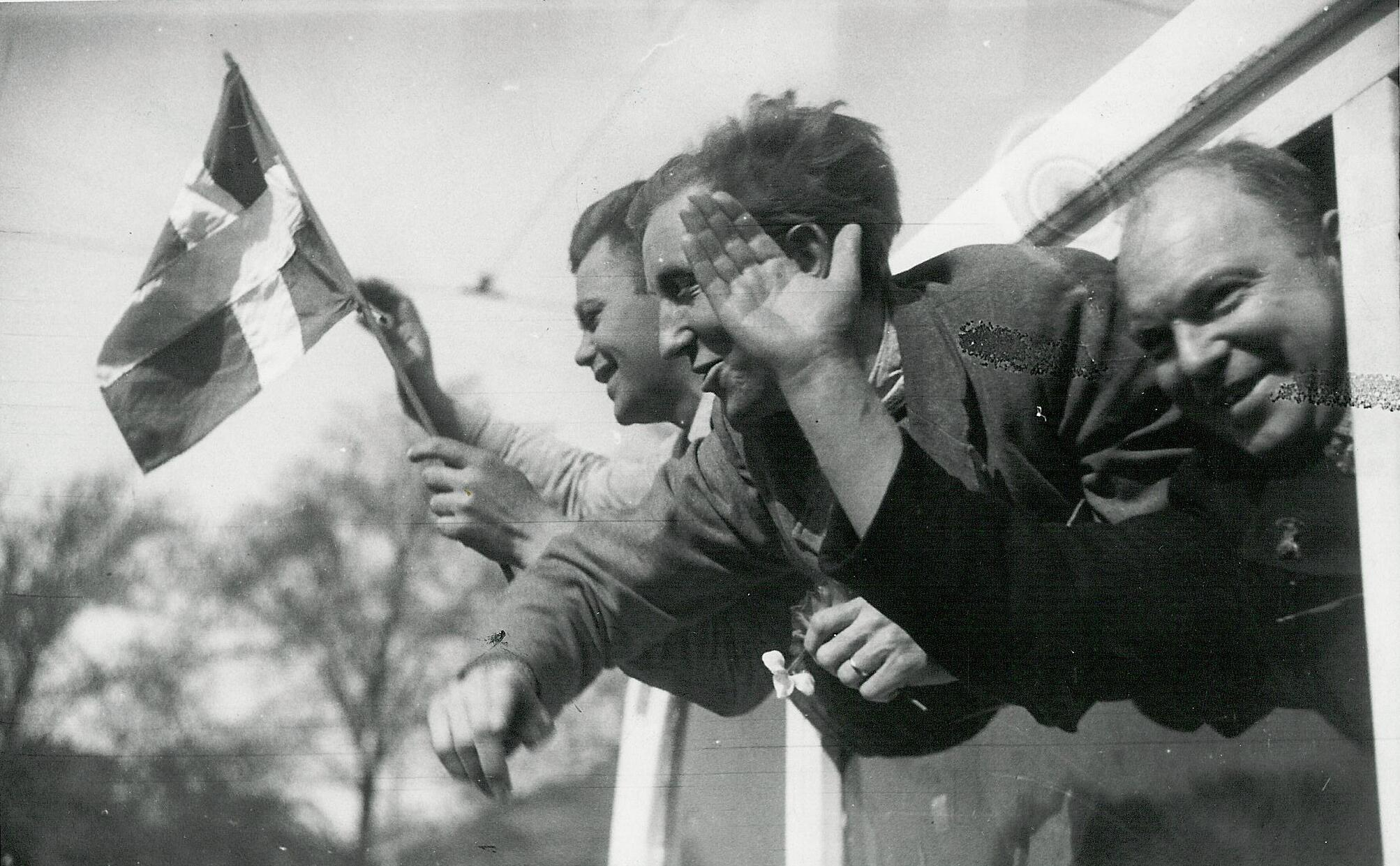
Policemen returning from KZ, 1945

The Danish ministry of foreign affairs headed by Nils Svenningsen negotiated with the German authorities in Denmark over the release of Danish concentration camp inmates. From late September 1944, transport with Red Cross packs was organized. An agreement was reached on 8 December 1944, for the release (and transport back to Denmark) of 200 sick policemen.

Simultaneously with the Danish negotiations, the Swedish count Folke Bernadotte intended to get all Scandinavian concentration camp prisoners to Sweden. The efforts to get prisoners from Scandinavia out of the German camps continued in the following months. In March and April 1945, 10,000 Danish and Norwegian captives were brought home from Germany in White Buses. The majority of the deported policemen travelled with these vehicles. Some of the returning captives arrived at Frøslev Prison Camp just north of the border between Germany and Denmark.

== Number of deaths ==
The number of Danish policemen who died during their incarceration in the German camps varies between 81 and 90, depending on the source. Several died afterwards due to camp-related illnesses. This group is a little more difficult to delimit. According to a calculation in 1968, 131 policemen died.

The mortality rate among the Danish policemen was reduced after they left Buchenwald and were transferred to Mühlberg in December 1944. 62 men died in Buchenwald.

== Bibliography ==
- Matthias Bath: Danebrog gegen Hakenkreuz, Wachholz, 2011, ISBN 978-3-529-02817-5.
