= Herbert Mehlhorn =

SS-Oberführer Herbert Mehlhorn
- Born: 24 March 1903; Chemnitz, German Empire
- Died: 30 September 1968 (aged 65) Tübingen, Germany
- Allegiance: Nazi Germany
- Branch: Schutzstaffel
- Service years: 1933–1945
- Rank: SS-Oberführer
- Conflicts: World War II

Georg Herbert Mehlhorn (24 March 1903 – 30 October 1968) was a German SS Oberführer, Nazi legal expert, and Gestapo official. Mehlhorn was involved in the camouflage of the mass graves of the Jewish victims in the forest of the Chełmno extermination camp. He operated gas wagons at the Chełmno camp to murder the sick Jewish prisoners who were sent from the Wartheland ghettoes. He was also a director of Stiftung Nordhav, a front organization of the Sicherheitsdienst founded in 1939 by Reinhard Heydrich, one of the main architects of the Holocaust. He was the mentor of SS-Brigadeführer Walter Schellenberg while at the SS-Hauptamt.

== Early life ==
Mehlhorn was the son of a wealthy industrialist. Other sources say that he was a son of a church worker. He was born in 1903 in Chemnitz He attended Realschule in Chemnitz. As a schoolboy, he became a member of nationalist paramilitary organizations. At 16 years of age, he resisted the rules set forward by the Allied Disarmament Commission for Germany, by taking part in exercises involving the camouflage of weapons.

Although too young at the time to participate in armed fights between German paramilitaries and Polish fighters over the threatened annexation of Silesia, he still resisted by participating in the underground resistance. Later on, Mehlhorn became an expert on armaments and military policy and used to give lectures in meetings organized by youth sports societies such as Turnerschaft Mundenia. Melhorn has been described as a "strange character".

== Education ==
Mehlhorn attended university from January 1923 to December 1926 for a total of 8 trimesters, studying in Göttingen, Munich and Leipzig, eventually obtaining his Ph.D. in 1928. His thesis was on "law history and penal practices related to poaching" (Die Bestimmung der Strafe für die Wilderei). His grade was very high and upon graduation he was the only one from his class not to become a civil servant, opting instead to join the ranks of a famous law office at Chemnitz.

== Career ==
Mehlhorn became a member of NSDAP in 1931 and a member of the SS in 1933. His career in the SD started when the organization was a small nucleus of officers at its formative stage. He was deemed important enough to be hired along with Lothar Beutel, Hermann Behrends, and Wilhelm Albert in order to help with the formation of SD as an organization.

Mehlhorn was given the task of organizing the administrative apparatus of the new service and became head of its administration between 1932 and 1937. On 1 September 1933 he became deputy leader of the Gestapo branch in Saxony. In 1935, Mehlhorn was sent to the Berlin headquarters of the SD to assume a high-echelon position, probably due to legal advice he provided concerning the financial affairs of Heydrich's mother. Post-1945, Mehlhorn worked as legal officer in the town of Oberndorf am Neckar.

== Gleiwitz incident ==
According to Schellenberg, Mehlhorn was "in a state of shock" when ordered by Heydrich, whom he considered his enemy, to lead the Gleiwitz operation. Schellenberg advised Mehlhorn to ask Heydrich to excuse him from taking part in the planned attack due to physical inability; Mehlhorn followed Schellenberg's advice and was surprised when Heydrich dismissed him from the ranks of the SD without raising any issues. In 1939, he was sent to Posen where he joined the CdZ after his relation with Heydrich deteriorated.

== Mass-murder coordinator ==
Mehlhorn was the head of Department I in the Warthegau which was responsible for the General, Domestic, and Financial affairs of the Reichsstatthalter and also assisted in drafting many of the orders issued by Greiser. Mehlhorn coordinated Gauleiter Arthur Greiser's mass murder operations, having been appointed in 1941 as the man "responsible for all Jewish questions".

While at the Gau, Mehlhorn coordinated his activities closely with Greiser's deputy August Jäger and maintained excellent rapport with both Heinrich Himmler and Greiser. His tasks included disguising the mass graves of the Jewish victims in the forest of the Chełmno extermination camp. To that effect, in the spring of 1942 he asked Heinrich May, a Nazi forester, to plant birch and pine trees and other shrubs and plants over the mass graves in the forest in an attempt to hide them from view.

The plan did not work however because the stench was overpowering. This forced the reopening of the graves in June 1942 and the burning of the decaying bodies. May, during a conversation with Mehlhorn, had remarked that they could always claim the bodies were those of murdered Germans in the event that the mass graves were ever discovered. Mehlhorn also operated gas wagons at the Chełmno camp to murder the sick Jewish prisoners who were sent from the Wartheland ghettoes.

Mehlhorn died in Tübingen in 1968.
