= HIPO Corps =

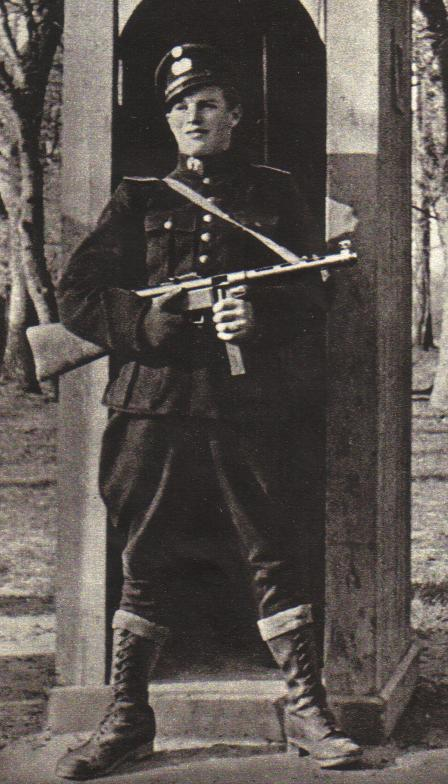
- Armed HIPO policeman
- Active: 1944–45
- Country: Denmark
- Allegiance: Nazi Germany
- Branch: Auxiliary police
- Role: Anti-partisan activities (assisting Nazi German occupying forces and the Gestapo to combat the Danish resistance movement)

The HIPO Corps (Danish: HIPO-korpset) was a Danish auxiliary police corps, established by the German Gestapo on 19 September 1944, when the Danish civil police force was disbanded and most of its officers were arrested and deported to concentration camps in Germany. The majority of HIPO members were recruited from the ranks of Danish Nazi collaborators. The word HIPO is an abbreviation of the German word Hilfspolizei ("auxiliary police").

The purpose of HIPO was to assist the Gestapo as an auxiliary police unit. HIPO was organized under, and along quite similar lines to, the Gestapo. Some men were uniformed in order to be visible while others worked secretly in plain clothes. The uniformed men wore a black uniform with Danish police insignia. HIPO, like the Gestapo, had their own informers. The major difference was that most of the Gestapo were Germans working in an occupied country, while the HIPO Corps consisted entirely of Danes working for the German occupiers.

During the last winter of the war a number of HIPO members were tortured and killed by Danish resistance members. In retaliation and as a warning, the corps terrorized the civil population and blew up houses, factories, and even the Tivoli Gardens.

The Lorenzen Group, also known as section 9c, was an armed paramilitary group of Danes subordinate to the HIPO Corps.

After the war, service in the HIPO corps was one of the crimes of collaborationism that retroactively became capital offenses. Some two to three hundred HIPO members were prosecuted under these laws. About a dozen were executed between 1946 and 1950. A somewhat larger number received death sentences that were later reduced to long prison terms or parole.

== Bibliography ==
- Matthias Bath: Danebrog gegen Hakenkreuz. Wachholz, 2011, ISBN 978-3-529-02817-5.
- Erik Haaest: Hipofolk Lorenzen-gruppen – Danske Terrorister i Nazitiden. Documentas 2007.

== See also ==
- Deportation of the Danish police
- Occupation of Denmark
