= Luftschutzpolizei =

Historical civil defense organization

- The Polizeiadler (Police Eagle) was used by the LSP

Agency overview
- Formed: 1942
- Dissolved: 1945
- Type: Civil defense
- Jurisdiction: Local
- Headquarters: Berlin
- Employees: 165,000
- Minister responsible: Heinrich Himmler
- Parent agency: Hauptamt Ordnungspolizei * Inspektion für die Luftschutzpolizei und den Luftschutzeinsatz

The Luftschutzpolizei (LSP, lit. 'Air Protection Police') was the local civil defense organization in Nazi Germany.

== Formation ==
LSP was the civil protection service in charge of rescuing victims of bombings in connection with the Technische Nothilfe (Technical Emergency Service) and the Feuerschutzpolizei (professional fire departments). Created as the Security and Assistance Service (Sicherheits und Hilfsdienst (SHD)) in 1935, it was renamed "Luftschutzpolizei" in April 1942, when transferred from the aegis of Ministry of Aviation to the Ordnungspolizei. The transfer took place as part of the reorganization of the German civil defense caused by the heavy casualties suffered from Allied bombings of civilian targets. The local SHD was transferred to the Ordnungspolizei as Luftschutzpolizei. The mobile reserve columns were transferred to the Luftwaffe, as motorized rescue battalions, and greatly expanded.

== Organization ==
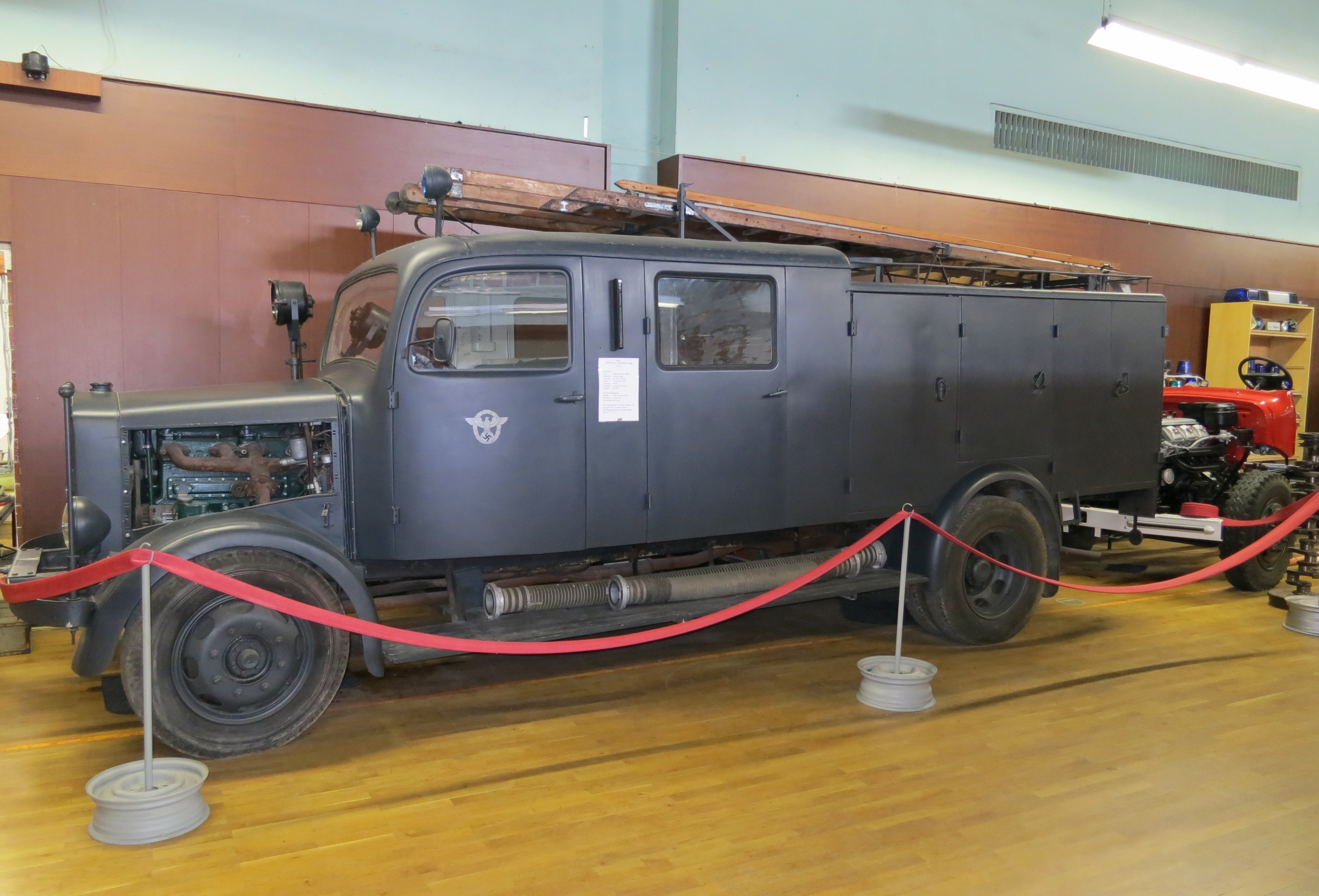
Mercedes-Benz SLG fire engine of the LSP

The LSP belonged to the Technical Auxiliary Police together with the Technical Emergency Service and the volunteer fire departments. It was subordinate to the local civil defense commander (the local state or municipal police commissioner), and under the direct leadership of the local protection police commander (Kommandeuer der Schutzpolizei), who exercised tactical command during air raid protection operations. In Hauptamt Ordnungspolizei, civil defense matters were handled by the Inspectorate of Air Raid Protection and Air Raid Protection Police.

The LSP contained the following services:

- Fire-fighting and decontamination service (FE)
- Repair, demolition and rescue services (I)
- Medical and first aid service (S)
- Veterinary first aid service (V)
- Specialized technical squads (H)

The LSP was organized in Abteilungen (battalions), Bereitschaften (companies), Züge (platoons), Gruppen (squads), and Trupps (teams).

The LSP in Hamburg, had in 1943 9,300 members, organized as follows:

- 30 F-companies
- 18 F-platoons (water)
- 8 Decontamination parks
- 18 I-companies
- 13 I-parks
- 13 S-companies
- 72 Medical air raid centers
- 3 Medical supply depots
- 7 Veterinary air raid centers
- 5 H-companies.

== Materiel ==
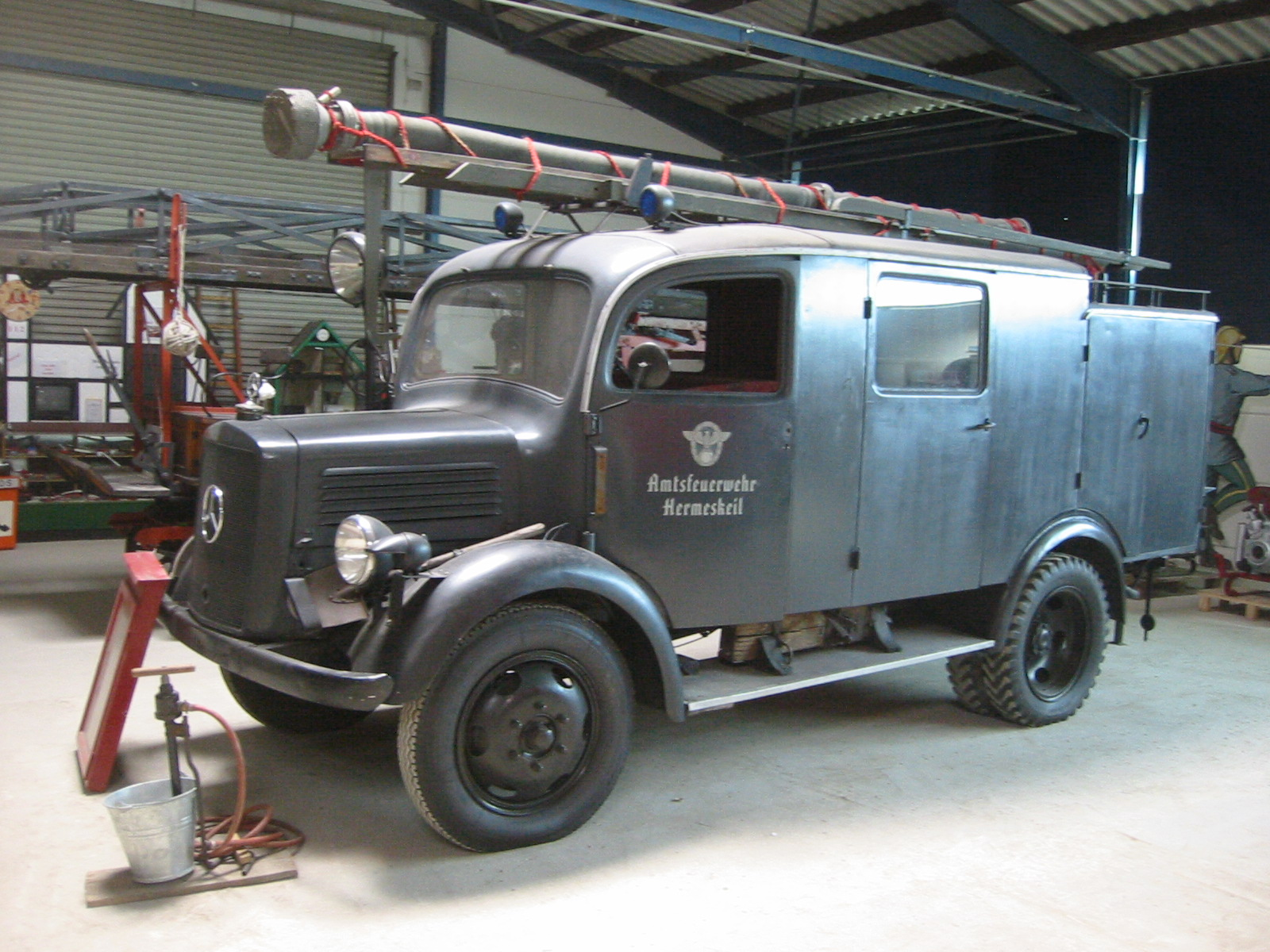
A fire engine LF-8 of a volunteer fire department in the war time gray-blue livery. The vehicles of the LSP was in the same color, later in dull dark gray.

A Fire-fighting company was, according to the table of equipment, outfitted with the following vehicles. In reality, this standard could not always be maintained.

- 2 Fire engines LF-25 with a capacity of 2,500 liters water per minute.
- 2 Fire engines LF-15 with a capacity of 1,500 liters water per minute.
- 2 Fire engines LF-8 with a capacity of 800 liters water per minute.
- 1 Hose vehicle
- 1 Ladder truck, large

== Personnel ==
The personnel was made up of men over conscription age, drafted into full-time civil defense service. Allied intelligence sources believed the mean age was 45 years old. The manpower needs of the Wehrmacht, the industry, and the economy had priority over the LSP. As a result, only 70% of the billets in the table of organization could be filled. Many of the men were of questionable physical stamina. As members of the LSP they were also members of the reserve police. Officers of the LSP were trained at the Police Academy for Air Raid Protection Tactics, at Berlin-Schöneberg. While in uniform or performing an official duty, they were subject to the special SS and police jurisdiction.

== Ranks ==
Former ranks in the SHD	Ranks in the Luftschutzpolizei 1942	Ranks in the Luftschutzpolizei 1943	Comparative ranks British Army
SHD-Mann	LS-Mann	Anwärter d. LS-Pol	Private
SHD-Mann	LS-Mann	Unterwachtmeister d. LS-Pol	Senior Private
SHD-Truppführer	LS-Truppführer	Rottwachtmeister d. LS-Pol	Lance Corporal
SHD-Gruppenführer	LS-Gruppenführer	Wachtmeister d. LS-Pol	Corporal
SHD-Gruppenführer	LS-Gruppenführer	Oberwachtmeister d. LS-Pol	Sergeant
SHD-Hauptgruppenführer	LS-Hauptgruppenführer	Zugwachtmeister d. LS-Pol	Staff Sergeant
SHD-Stabsgruppenführer	LS-Stabsgruppenführer	Hauptwachtmeister d. LS-Pol	Sergeant Major
–	–	Meister d. LS-Pol	Sergeant Major
SHD-Zugführer	LS-Zugführer	Zugführer d. LS-Pol	Second Lieutenant
SHD-Oberzugführer	LS-Oberzugführer	Oberzugführer d. LS-Pol	First Lieutenant
SHD-Bereitschaftsführer	LS-Bereitschaftsführer	Bereitschaftsführer d. LS-Pol	Captain
SHD-Abteilungsführer	LS-Abteilungsführer	Abteilungsführer d. LS-Pol	Major
SHD-Abteilungsführer mit besonderem Auftrag	LS-Abteilungsleiter	Oberabteilungsführer d. LS-Pol	Lieutenant colonel
