= Walter Schellenberg =

Intelligence officer in Nazi Germany (1910–1952)

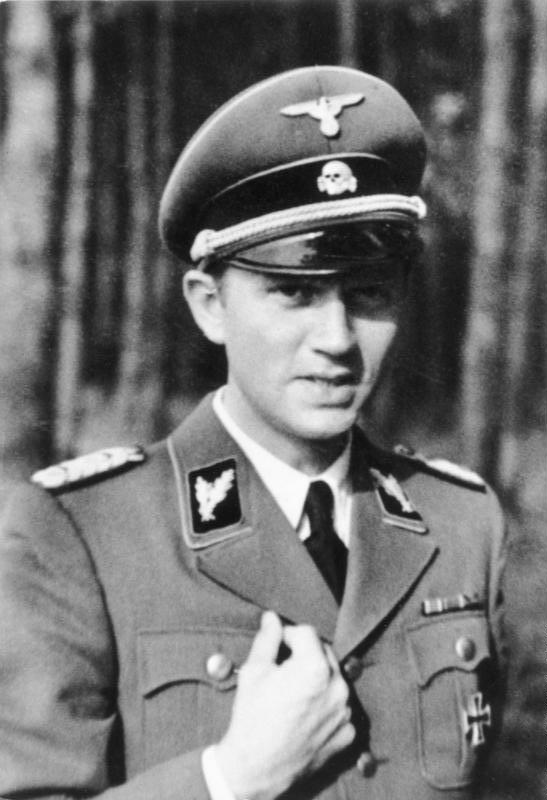
- Schellenberg as an SS-Oberführer in 1943
- Born: Walter Friedrich Schellenberg; 16 January 1910; Saarbrücken, Germany
- Died: 31 March 1952 (aged 42); Turin, Italy
- Military career
- Allegiance: Nazi Germany
- Branch: Schutzstaffel
- Service years: 1933–1945
- Rank: SS-Brigadeführer und Generalmajor der Polizei
- Unit: Sicherheitsdienst
- Commands: Chief of Amt VI, Ausland-SD
- Awards: Iron Cross First Class; War Merit Cross First and Second Class with Swords

Walter Friedrich Schellenberg (16 January 1910 – 31 March 1952) was a German Schutzstaffel (SS) functionary during the Nazi era who rose through the ranks of the Sicherheitsdienst (SD) to become one of its highest-ranking officers. Following the dissolution of the Abwehr in the aftermath of the July 1944 assassination attempt, Schellenberg became the effective master of all Nazi foreign intelligence. A direct subordinate of Reinhard Heydrich and later the closest professional confidant of Reichsführer-SS Heinrich Himmler, Schellenberg was implicated in the expansion of the Einsatzgruppen killing operations associated with the genocide of those the Nazis defined as Jews.

In the war's final months, Schellenberg worked to persuade Himmler to negotiate a separate peace with the Western Allies through Count Folke Bernadotte, and he personally arranged the transport of 1,700 Jews from German-controlled territory to Switzerland and Sweden—an effort Hitler terminated when he learned of it. Tried at Nuremberg during the Ministries Trial, he was sentenced to six years' imprisonment, released after two years on grounds of ill health, and died in Turin in 1952.

== Career ==
Schellenberg, born in Saarbrücken, Germany, was his parents' seventh child; his father was a piano manufacturer. Schellenberg has stated his family moved to Luxembourg when the French occupied (1920) the Saar Basin after the First World War and the Weimar Republic experienced an economic crisis in the early 1920s. Like many young intellectuals who later joined the Sicherheitsdienst (SD), Schellenberg was deeply affected by the economic woes which befell Germany in the wake of the First World War.

Schellenberg returned to Germany to attend university, first at Marburg University and then, from 1929, at the University of Bonn. He initially studied medicine, but soon switched to law. While in law school, Schellenberg performed some spy work for the SD. He reported actually having been recruited by two SD agents who were college faculty, who also advised him to join the Civil Service. After graduating he joined the SS in 1933. (Schellenberg later wrote that the "better type of people" preferred the SS over the other Nazi organizations.) Although educated as a lawyer, Schellenberg distrusted administrative attorneys and was intent on ensuring that the SD could operate outside the constraints of normal law. Subscribing to the Führerprinzip, Schellenberg also regarded Hitler's directives as beyond the framework of the legal system and believed it was best to "unquestioningly" carry out anything ordered by the Nazi leader.

In 1935, Schellenberg met Reinhard Heydrich and worked for him in the counter-intelligence department of the SD. Besides his native German, Schellenberg also spoke French and English fluently. Correspondingly, his first foreign-intelligence assignment was to Paris in 1934 to check up on the political views of a professor. Then in 1937, Schellenberg was sent to Italy for a police assignment which included security duties for an upcoming visit by Mussolini; his outstanding work in providing security garnered positive attention from Heydrich, who then gave him additional organizational responsibilities, some of which later helped give birth to the Reich Security Main Office (RSHA) in 1939. The official SS personnel report on Schellenberg described him as "open, irreproachable, and reliable"; the file also depicted him as "firm, tough, possesses energy" and as "very sharp thinking"; his National Socialist worldview was labeled "thoroughly fortified". Many of the SS street-brawling types despised men like Schellenberg, considering them effete, but for the most part Schellenberg made a good impression on the Nazi elite.

Sometime in 1938 Schellenberg married Käthe Kortekamp, a seamstress three years his senior, whom he dated for seven years and who had supported him through college. Their marriage proved brief, partially because of her social standing and because many things about her embarrassed him; the relationship ended in divorce in 1939, but only after Schellenberg promised her an aryanized fashion business expropriated from Jewish owners. Shortly thereafter, he married a more socially-acceptable woman named Irene Grosse-Schönepauck, the daughter of an insurance executive, but this relationship was also troubled.

As the Nazis tightened their grip on German society, Hitler and Reichsführer-SS Heinrich Himmler determined that the SS and police organs should merge, a move which Schellenberg fully supported: on 24 February 1939 he released a memorandum which advocated further centralization within the state. In summer 1939, Schellenberg became one of the directors of Heydrich's foundation, the Stiftung Nordhav. Schellenberg was mentored by Herbert Mehlhorn while at the SS-Hauptamt. When Heydrich announced his intention to create the Reich Security Main Office (RSHA) in July 1939, he had Schellenberg to thank as both the organisation's name and its existence resulted from his plans. On 27 September 1939, Himmler decreed the RSHA an official state organisation.

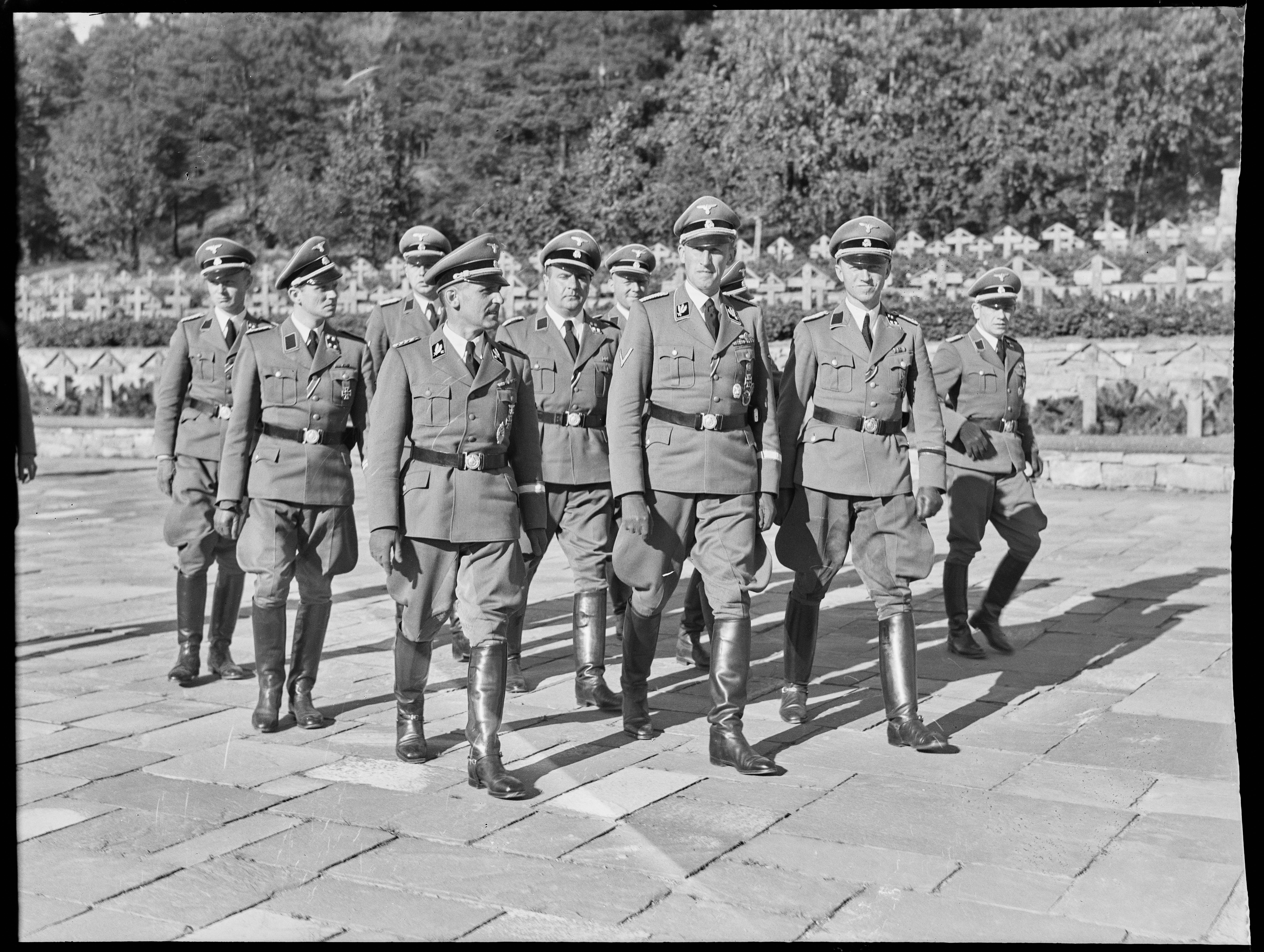
Heinrich Müller (Gestapo) (front row, to the left) and Reinhard Heydrich and SS-Oberführer Heinrich Fehlis (leader of SD and SiPo in Norway) to the right. Also SS-Hauptsturmführer Hermann Kluckhohn, SS-Sturmbannführer Walter Schellenberg, Rudolf Schiedermair, and other SS police officers at Ekeberg cemetery for German soldiers in Oslo during Heydrich's visit to Norway, 3–6 September 1941.

== Einsatzgruppen – 1941 ==
As the role of the SS and its action groups, the Einsatzgruppen, expanded in the war zones and prospective war zones in May 1941, Schellenberg negotiated with the Wehrmacht to acquire logistical support from the army (both on the front line and in rear areas) so the Einsatzgruppen could carry out their killing operations more effectively. Acting on behalf of Heydrich, Schellenberg issued a circular on 20 May 1941 to all segments of the German Security Police which forbade any Jews from emigrating out of German-controlled territory; this new policy formed part of the genocidal Final Solution. The language within the circular Schellenberg issued even contained the explicit expression: "in view of the undoubtedly imminent Final Solution of the Jewish question", wording that makes it clear he was both complicit in and aware of the impending extermination activities. Despite being Heydrich's direct subordinate, Schellenberg skillfully ingratiated himself with Himmler by first delivering his intelligence reports to him instead of to Heydrich, which earned him the Reichsführer's confidence. After Heydrich's death in June 1942, Schellenberg became the "closest professional confidant" of Himmler. Himmler bestowed upon Schellenberg a unique position beyond that of a simple aide, making him his special plenipotentiary (Sonderbevollmächtigter).

== SD operations ==
When Walter Schellenberg moved to Frankfurt in 1934, he recalled meeting an SS-Oberführer, who explained to him the mission of the SD; he was told the following, which he wrote in his memoirs:

The SD was the chief organ of the intelligence service of the party. Its task was to inform the top Party leaders of all opposition movements and forces at home and abroad. It covered the administration, the Party, industry, the theatre, journalism, the police—in fact there was no sphere that was not under the watchful eye of the SD, no place where it did not seek out the first signs of opposition among movements or individuals 'hostile' to the state'.

In March 1938, Schellenberg traveled with Himmler and Heydrich to Vienna for the impending Anschluss with Austria. One of the reasons for their journey was so the SD could "confiscate Austrian secret service material." During the trip, Schellenberg allegedly saved Himmler from a potential mishap when he noticed that the aircraft door that he had been leaning against was not properly secured. Throwing Himmler aside in the process, Schellenberg earned the gratitude of the Reichsführer, who promised to reciprocate the favor if the chance ever presented itself. Following the exuberant reception of Hitler when he arrived in Vienna, Schellenberg later wrote, "'never...have I seen such tremendous, enthusiastic and joyous crowds."

Much like Austria, the Nazis set their sights on the Sudetenland of Czechoslovakia, a region with over three million ethnic Germans which they wanted to incorporate into the Reich; more than that, Hitler once told his generals that he desired for Czechoslovakia to "disappear from the map". In the summer of 1938, the Gestapo and SD-Ausland, which had taken control of the Secret Service in Czechoslovakia, helped the Sudeten Nazis from the Sudetendeutsche Partei infiltrate regional and local organizations, veterans groups, musical societies, sporting associations, sailing clubs, and cultural societies—which gave them insight into the economic, political, and military situation there. So thorough was the Nazi penetration in much of the Sudetenland, that Schellenberg stated later it was necessary to establish two telephone transmission stations along the frontier to communicate with Berlin. Eventually after strained negotiations with the West, Hitler acquired the Sudetenland when the Munich Agreement was concluded. Following this event, Schellenberg accompanied Hitler, Himmler, and Heydrich into Prague on 15 March 1939 and reported that Himmler was so pleased with the performance and racial makeup of the Czech police, that he incorporated them into the SS.

In November 1939 Schellenberg played a major part in the Venlo Incident, which led to the capture of two British MI6 agents, Captain Sigismund Payne-Best and Major Richard Stevens. Schellenberg posed as a "Major Schaemmel" claiming to be part of an anti-Nazi group of officers planning a coup against Hitler. At Schellenberg's third meeting with Stevens and Best in the German-Dutch border town of Venlo, the trap was sprung; the two British agents were captured. Hitler awarded Schellenberg the Iron Cross for his actions. (Note: "The Venlo Kidnapping", The Times, 19 February 1948.) Success in this operation helped the SD acquire greater leverage in foreign policy and gave their police Attachés access to foreign networks through the diplomatically immune offices of the German embassies abroad. The operation also damaged British morale and inclined them to mistrust the opposition in Germany.

In 1940, Schellenberg was sent to Portugal by Heydrich at Foreign Minister Joachim von Ribbentrop's request to intercept the Duke and Duchess of Windsor and try to persuade them to work for Germany (Operation Willi). Ribbentrop believed that the former King Edward VIII, was open to making peace with the Reich in exchange for being allowed to regain his throne. The duke of Windsor was scheduled to leave Lisbon for the Bahamas where he had been appointed governor. Schellenberg was supposed to offer them 50 million Swiss francs to go to neutral Switzerland. However, Winston Churchill dispatched an attorney, Walter Monckton, an old friend of the Duke's, to convince them to leave Portugal. Schellenberg planned to repeat the same operation used in Venlo to kidnap the duke and duchess of Windsor which added with "psychologically adroit influence" would in Schellenberg's view cause the duke to declare himself for peace with Germany. Under Schellenberg's plan, the duke and duchess would be invited to go hunting near the Portuguese-Spanish border, and then a corrupt Portuguese border official would allow a German team to cross over the frontier to kidnap the Windsors. The plan failed when the duke of Windsor declined the offer to go hunting. When it became clear that the duke of Windsor was going to leave Lisbon to take up his post as Governor of the Bahamas, Schellenberg tried hard to keep the duke from leaving. Schellenberg sent a bouquet of flowers to the duchess of Windsor along with a death threat, saying she and her husband would die if they went to the Bahamas. Schellenberg sent the duke of Windsor a list of all the Jews who would be sailing on the same ship that was to take him to the Bahamas along with a signed statement from the chief of the Portuguese counterespionage police that he could not guarantee the duke's safety if he sailed on that ship. Finally, Schellenberg bribed the duke's British chauffeur to talk to him about how dangerous it would be for him to go to the Bahamas. Despite all of Schellenberg's efforts, the duke and duchess of Windsor left for the Bahamas. In the end, the mission was a failure; Schellenberg managed nothing more than a delay of the Duke's baggage for a few hours.

In June 1940, he was charged with compiling the Informationsheft G.B., a blueprint for the occupation of Britain after a proposed invasion by Nazi Germany. The preparations for invasion, known as Operation Sea Lion (Unternehmen Seelöwe), were ultimately abandoned. He based his work on the interrogations of British agents Best and Stevens, along with his own "preconceptions". Part of what he prepared was described as "a handbook for German troops and officials as a guide to the British institutions they would encounter." The extent of his direct involvement in compiling the book and its supplement, however, has been disputed. The supplement was the "Special Wanted List, GB" (Sonderfahndungsliste G.B., also known as "The Black Book"), which was a list of 2,300 prominent Britons to be arrested immediately after the successful invasion of Britain. Both Schellenberg and Heydrich perceived Great Britain as a country run by "Freemasons, Jews, and a small public-school-trained elite." Despite the poor opinion of Britain shared by both men, their full attention was turned there when on 10 May 1941, Deputy Führer Rudolf Hess made his infamous flight to Scotland. Subsequently, SD Chief Schellenberg informed Hitler that Hess had been long under the influence of the British Secret Service and German collaborators. Upon further investigation, Schellenberg also reported to Hitler that Hess made his flight under the advice of an astrologer, which incited the activity of Heydrich who promptly arrested as many mediums, psychics, and astrologers he could round up in Berlin.

Besides reactive intelligence reports like those he provided concerning Hess, Schellenberg arranged numerous plots of subterfuge and intelligence gathering, including the bugging of Salon Kitty, a high-class Berlin brothel. Some of the Nazi regime's upper echelons even visited this brothel unaware at first, such as Foreign Minister Joachim von Ribbentrop. However, intelligence collection efforts at Salon Kitty were essentially a failure as they never revealed anything significant.

Direct access to Himmler also made Schellenberg privy to some of the Reich's most sensitive material. For example, Schellenberg knew early on about the arrangement between Germany and the Soviet Union concerning the partition of Poland, an agreement that presaged the military invasion. Once the Nazis invaded and occupied Polish territory, Schellenberg was entrusted with securing the rear areas by Himmler and Heydrich, which meant he oversaw the deployment of special commandos from the SD and Gestapo, units which carried out brutal measures against the Poles. Another one of his areas of responsibility was counter-espionage, both within Germany and the occupied territories—a task for which Schellenberg seemed well-suited given his penchant for intrigue. Operating as an intelligence adviser to Himmler in Poland meant Schellenberg was at the front edge of the spear, but this did not mean he was incapable of being surprised. In fact, he was particularly shocked at the utter devastation wrought by the Wehrmacht in Poland and commented in his Memoirs upon seeing it that, "Until then I had no real conception of what total war meant."

In March 1940, he helped convince Hitler that Dutch military intelligence was working closely with the British intelligence services, which Hitler used as a pretext to attack the Netherlands "for violating their neutrality."

In February 1942, after the 1941 German attack on the Soviet Union had stalled, Schellenberg conceived and implemented a large-scale spy operation designed to penetrate into the Soviet Union, an initiative known as Operation Zeppelin (Unternehmen Zeppelin). Using anti-Communists selected from the many thousands of POWs captured by the Germans, he soon had anywhere from 10,000 to 15,000 potential candidates in training, who were accordingly indoctrinated. Only between 2,000 and 3,000 completed the training, and as little as a few hundred of them were ever committed to the operation due to insufficient numbers of aircraft and radio communication equipment. What started as a large-scale effort by Schellenberg, quickly became a precision one with very limited success. Most of them produced little to no useful intelligence and/or were killed once deployed. One German intelligence officer commented that if losses "were not over 90 percent, we were satisfied."

In March 1942, Heinz Jost was fired as RSHA Chief of Amt VI, SD-Ausland (SD foreign intelligence). In his place, Schellenberg was appointed chief of SD-Ausland by Heydrich. Sometime in mid-1942, Schellenberg had been involved in planning operations in neutral Ireland including Operation Osprey: a plan involving No.1 SS Special Service Troop. (Note: Later becoming 500th SS Parachute Battalion a/k/a/ SS-Fallschirmjäger-Bataillon 500, an amalgamation of No. 1 Troop and various SS penal battalions, notably participating in Operation Rösselsprung, the raid against Tito's HQ in 1944.) Knowledge that Germany might lose the war prompted Schellenberg to open communication channels during the fall of 1942 with the Swiss intelligence chief, Colonel Roger Masson. He even went so far as providing Masson with a list of all the Abwehr (military intelligence) agents operating in Switzerland with the intention of "having them expelled."

When the Allies invaded Italy in 1943, Schellenberg went to great lengths to ensure the safety of Amin al-Husseini, the anti-Semitic and anti-British Grand Mufti of Jerusalem, who was residing in Rome, by having him transported away to Berlin. As the Red Army repulsed the Germans and began driving them back to the west, the German General Staff began planning a retreat into Fortress Europe—which included the incorporation of Switzerland into the defensive operation. Using his previous channels to Schellenberg, the Swiss intelligence chief Masson, who was privy to this plan known as "Case Switzerland", contacted Schellenberg as to whether or not an attack on Switzerland was imminent. By asking Schellenberg this question, Masson naively revealed to Schellenberg that a leak existed within Hitler's headquarters, but it also meant the Germans lost the opportunity for a surprise attack against Switzerland. To further ingratiate himself to the Swiss, Schellenberg claimed that he had convinced the German high command of the needlessness for such an operation. Despite having direct contacts to Schellenberg himself, the Director in Switzerland of the OSS, Allen Dulles, expressed deep concern about the possible intelligence leaks between Masson and Schellenberg.

Signals intelligence intercepts alerted the Gestapo and SD to the "Red Orchestra", the Soviet spy ring in Germany. Schellenberg led extensive efforts over many months to identify the participants. 116 were arrested by the Gestapo, half of whom were executed following intense interrogations. By this time, Schellenberg had become a general (Brigadeführer) in the Allgemeine-SS (General-SS). The operation was a major victory for the RSHA at the expense of the Abwehr, who had been oblivious to the Soviet operation. Historian Klaus Fischer asserts that Schellenberg's "only major success was smashing the Red Orchestra."

=== Control of all intelligence operations ===
Reportedly, Schellenberg and Wilhelm Canaris, the head of the Abwehr, were friends. They would go horseback-riding together in Berlin's wooded Grunewald, where they discussed the future of Nazi Germany. Often present at these equestrian outings were Heydrich and Werner Best. Their alleged friendship aside, Canaris was careful around Schellenberg, a man whose ambitions included controlling all intelligence for the Reich. Like Heydrich, Schellenberg ultimately envisioned a centrally directed "all-embracing security system" and a singular "Greater German Intelligence Service" under direct Nazi control (unlike the Abwehr, which was part of the Wehrmacht). Nonetheless, there are indications that Schellenberg preferred to deal with Canaris' Abwehr over the Gestapo, particularly since he distrusted its chief, Heinrich Müller. However, after the attempted assassination of Hitler on 20 July 1944, the Abwehr was dissolved and the SD was given additional powers over intelligence across the Reich. (Note: Despite Canaris falling from grace and being implicated as a double-agent who worked against Germany, Schellenberg referred to Canaris as "Germany's finest spy" until the end of his life.) Canaris was arrested on 23 July 1944 on the basis of the interrogation of his successor at military intelligence, Georg Hansen.

As a result, sections of the Abwehr were incorporated into RSHA Amt VI SD-Ausland and therefore placed under Schellenberg's command. Assumption of these powers made Schellenberg the "absolute master" of Nazi intelligence". He was infamous for his "office fortress" desk, which had two automatic guns built into it that could be fired by the touch of a button. According to the memoirs of SS intelligence officer Wilhelm Hoettl, Schellenberg was very suspicious of Gestapo Chief Müller, whom he claimed to have evidence against by way of radio surveillance recordings (allegedly revealing Müller's plans to work with the Soviets); when he informed then RSHA chief Ernst Kaltenbrunner of possessing proof to that end, he was ignored. Kaltenbrunner disliked Schellenberg, perhaps due to his direct access to Himmler, and complained about him in particular on a number of occasions. Despite Kaltenbrunner's animosity towards Schellenberg, the latter's soothing manners kept him in good graces with Himmler and allowed him to "retain the ear of the SS overlord".

=== Operation Modellhut ===
Allied military intelligence documents have been unearthed linking French couturier Coco Chanel to espionage activity in concert with Schellenberg, who reportedly was also one of her romantic liaisons. In 1943–1944, Operation Modellhut (Operation Model Hat) was conceived to capitalize on Chanel's long-standing associations with British aristocracy and her friendship with Winston Churchill. Schellenberg recruited Chanel to act as an intermediary in a plan (proposed by Chanel) whose goal was to broker a separate peace between Nazi Germany and Britain independently of other Allied powers; Operation Modellhut failed.

== Peace negotiations and capture ==
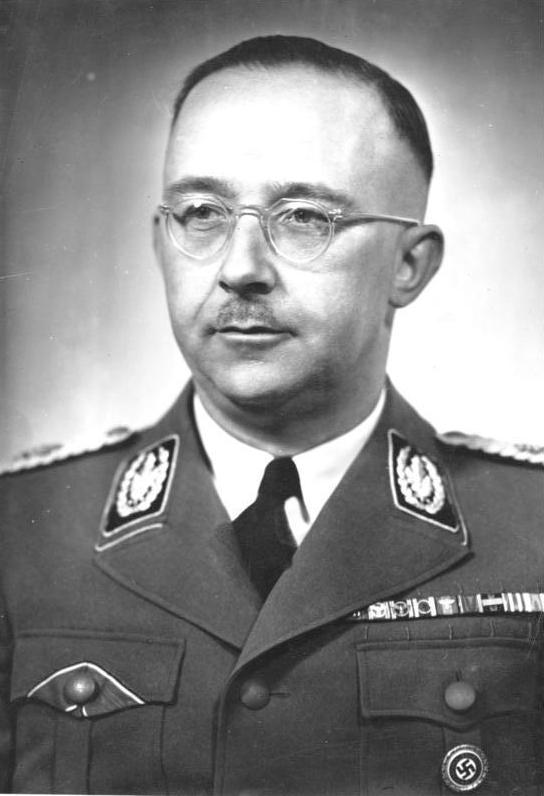
Himmler, 1942

During early 1945, Schellenberg encouraged Himmler to overthrow Hitler in order to negotiate a separate peace with the Western Allies, using as an excuse Hitler's poor health; however, Himmler never took action, but instead vacillated. He also convinced Himmler to meet with the former president of Switzerland, Jean-Marie Musy, who promised to pay in Swiss francs for the release of Jews. At the end of the war, Schellenberg was able to persuade Himmler to try negotiating with the Western Allies through Count Folke Bernadotte. Schellenberg had earlier in the year worked as an intermediary between Count Bernadotte and Himmler for the release and safe passage of a number of prisoners and inmates held in concentration camps through the Swedish Red Cross.

In the spring of 1945, Schellenberg instigated further meetings with Count Bernadotte as an opening to the western powers. He personally went to Stockholm in April 1945 to arrange the meetings for Himmler. Both Himmler and Schellenberg continued to believe that the Jews interned in concentration camps represented a bargaining chip for the Nazi leadership: one they could use to derive concessions from the Western allies. To foster goodwill for their negotiations, Schellenberg—with Himmler's consent—organised the transport of 1,700 Jews out of German-controlled territory to Switzerland and Sweden. Hitler found out and put a stop to further evacuations.

After the first set of failed meetings, Schellenberg requested Bernadotte to intercede directly with General Eisenhower but this final action proved futile as well. At war's end, Schellenberg was in Denmark attempting to arrange his own surrender when the British took him into custody in June 1945. That same month, a Swedish dispatch reported that Schellenberg had "confessed" to Germany's complicity in the massacre of Polish officers at the Katyn forest. According to Schellenberg, the Germans then blamed the Soviets for the atrocity in an effort to split the allies.

The U.S., British, and Soviet intelligence services had all been searching for him as a valuable intelligence asset. Captain Horace Hahn, a member of the OSS, was one of the few Americans allowed to interrogate Schellenberg. Looking to recover as much information as they could from Schellenberg, the British sent him to London in July 1945 where he was extensively interrogated; their intention (along with the Americans) was to extract information on any remaining Nazi resistance yet to surface and to gather what they could on Germany's possible postwar intelligence activities. Schellenberg confirmed to the Allies that no such plans were in place, which was supported by Allied intelligence efforts. The fact that Schellenberg had been on the opposite side of the RSHA faction which included Kaltenbrunner, Müller, Ohlendorf and Skorzeny, along with other war criminals, was the "best thing" he had going for him at the end of the war. Additional independent signals intelligence also proved helpful in evaluating Schellenberg.

== Nuremberg trials ==
After the war, Schellenberg was arrested by British military police and eventually stood trial in Nuremberg. To spare himself from a long prison sentence, Schellenberg testified against the SS organisation and the Nazi leaders in its fold during the postwar trials. (Note: http://avalon.law.yale.edu/imt/01-04-46.asp Nuremberg Trial Proceedings Twenty-Seventh Day, Yale University's AVALON Project (cited 15 April 2016)) During the Ministries Trial, he wrote his memoirs, titled The Labyrinth. Historian Robert Gerwarth describes certain content of Schellenberg's memoirs as "questionable." (Note: A formerly classified book review by CIA intelligence officer Clinton Gallagher from 1957 reveals that doubt has long been cast on the validity of some of Schellenberg's claims. See: Gallagher, CIA Book Review of The Labyrnth) On 4 November 1949, he was sentenced to six years in prison for failing to prevent the murder of Soviet POWs who were used as agents in Operation Zeppelin. The tribunal found that near the end of the war, Schellenberg had started aiding victims of the Nazi regime. It questioned whether he was acting out of good faith, but nevertheless credited him for his actions.

== Release and death ==
He was released from prison after two years on the grounds of ill-health, due to a worsening liver condition, and moved to Switzerland, (Note: Some of his memoir was also written while he was in Switzerland with the assistance of his favorite secretary, Marie-Luise Schienke.) before settling in Verbania-Pallanza, Italy. In 1952, he died in Turin, Italy.

== See also ==
- Glossary of Nazi Germany
- List of Nazi Party leaders and officials
- List of SS personnel

== Bibliography ==
- Biddiscombe, Perry. (2000). "Unternehmen Zeppelin: The Deployment of SS Saboteurs and Spies in the Soviet Union, 1942–1945". Europe-Asia Studies. 52 (6): 1115–1142. doi:10.1080/09668130050143851. JSTOR 153592. S2CID 144885216.
- Breitman, Richard; Goda, Norman J.W.; Naftali, Timothy; Wolfe, Robert (2005). U.S. Intelligence and the Nazis. Cambridge and New York: Cambridge University Press. ISBN 978-0-52161-794-9.
- Browder, George C (1996). Hitler's Enforcers: The Gestapo and the SS Security Service in the Nazi Revolution. Oxford and New York: Oxford University Press. ISBN 978-0-19820-297-4.
- Buchheim, Hans (1968). "The SS – Instrument of Domination". In Krausnick, Helmut; Buchheim, Hans; Broszat, Martin Z; Jacobsen, Hans-Adolf (eds.). Anatomy of the SS State. New York: Walker and Company. ISBN 978-0-00211-026-6.
- Delarue, Jacques (2008). The Gestapo: A History of Horror. New York: Skyhorse. ISBN 978-1-60239-246-5.
- "Deutsche Biographie". Walter Schellenberg.
- Doerries, Reinhard R. (2003). Hitler's Last Chief of Foreign Intelligence: Allied interrogations of Walter Schellenberg. Portland: Frank Cass Publishers. ISBN 0-7146-5400-0.
- Doerries, Reinhard R.; Weinberg, Gerhard L. (2009). Hitler's Intelligence Chief: Walter Schellenberg. New York: Enigma Books. ISBN 978-1-92963-177-3.
- Evans, Richard (2006). The Third Reich in Power. New York: Penguin. ISBN 978-0-14303-790-3.
- Evans, Richard (2010). The Third Reich at War. New York: Penguin. ISBN 978-0-14311-671-4.
- Fischer, Klaus (1995). Nazi Germany: A New History. New York: Continuum. ISBN 978-0-82640-797-9.
- Fleming, Gerald (1994). Hitler and the Final Solution. Berkeley and Los Angeles: University of California Press. ISBN 0-520-06022-9.
- Gerwarth, Robert (2012). Hitler's Hangman: The Life of Heydrich. New Haven, CT: Yale University Press. ISBN 978-0-30018-772-4.
- Gilbert, Martin (1989). The Second World War: A Complete History. New York: Henry Holt and Company. ISBN 0-8050-0534-X.
- Graber, G. S. (1978). The History of the SS. New York: D. McKay. ISBN 0-679-50754-X.
- Grunberger, Richard (1993). Hitler's SS. New York: Dorset Press. ISBN 978-1-56619-152-4.
- Halbrook, Stephen (2010). The Swiss and the Nazis. Philadelphia, PA: Casemate Publishing. ISBN 978-1-93514-934-7.
- Hamilton, Charles (1996). Leaders & Personalities of the Third Reich, Vol. 2. R. James Bender Publishing. ISBN 0-912138-66-1.
- Hassell, Agostino von; MacRae, Sigrid; Ameskamp, Simone (2006). Alliance of Enemies: The Untold Story of the Secret American and German Collaboration to End World War II. New York: Thomas Dunne Books. ISBN 978-0-31237-482-2.
- Hastings, Max (2016). The Secret War: Spies, Ciphers, and Guerrillas, 1939–1945. New York: Harper. ISBN 978-0-06225-927-1.
- Höhne, Heinz (1979). Canaris: Hitler's Master Spy. New York: Doubleday. ISBN 0-385-08777-2.
- Höhne, Heinz (2001). The Order of the Death's Head: The Story of Hitler's SS. New York: Penguin Press. ISBN 978-0-14139-012-3.
- Horvitz, Leslie Alan; Catherwood, Christopher (2006). Encyclopedia of War Crimes and Genocide. New York: Facts on File. ISBN 978-1-43811-029-5.
- Infield, Glenn B. (1981). Skorzeny: Hitler's Commando. New York: St. Martin's. ISBN 978-0-312-72777-2.
- Kahn, David (1978). Hitler's Spies: German Military Intelligence in World War II. New York: MacMillan. ISBN 0-02-560610-7.
- Kershaw, Ian (2008). Hitler: A Biography. New York: W. W. Norton & Company. ISBN 978-0-393-06757-6.
- Longerich, Peter (2012). Heinrich Himmler. Oxford and New York: Oxford University Press. ISBN 978-0199592326.
- Manvell, Roger; Fraenkel, Heinrich (1987). Heinrich Himmler. New York: Skyhorse Publishing. ISBN 978-1-85367-740-3.
- Mayer, Arno (2012). Why Did the Heavens Not Darken?: The "Final Solution" in History. New York: Verso Publishing. ISBN 978-1-84467-777-1.
- Read, Anthony (2005). The Devil's Disciples: Hitler's Inner Circle. New York: Norton. ISBN 978-039332-697-0.
- Rhodes, Richard (2003). Masters of Death: The SS-Einsatzgruppen and the Invention of the Holocaust. New York: Vintage. ISBN 978-0-37570-822-0.
- Richelson, Jeffrey (1995). A Century of Spies: Intelligence in the Twentieth Century. Oxford and New York: Oxford University Press. ISBN 0-19-511390-X.
- Schellenberg, Walter (1956). The Schellenberg Memoirs. Translated by Louis Hagen. New York: André Deutsch.
- Schellenberg, Walter (2000) [1956]. The Labyrinth: Memoirs of Walter Schellenberg, Hitler's Chief of Counterintelligence, translated by Louis Hagen. Da Capo Press. ISBN 978-0306809279
- Shirer, William (1990). The Rise and Fall of the Third Reich. New York: MJF Books. ISBN 978-1-56731-163-1.
- Toland, John (1966). The Last 100 Days. New York: Random House.
- Vaughan, Hal (2011). Sleeping with the Enemy: Coco Chanel's Secret War. New York: Knopf. ISBN 978-0-307-59263-7.
- Waller, John H. (1996). The Unseen War in Europe: Espionage and Conspiracy in the Second World War. New York: Random House. ISBN 978-0-67944-826-6.
- Weale, Adrian (2012). Army of Evil: A History of the SS. New York: Caliber Printing. ISBN 978-0-451-23791-0.
- Wistrich, Robert (1995). Who's Who in Nazi Germany. New York: Routledge. ISBN 978-0-41511-888-0.
- Zeitz, Joshua M. (8 May 2005). "The Nazis and Coco". The New York Times.
- Zentner, Christian; Bedurftig, Friedemann (1997) [1991]. The Encyclopedia of the Third Reich. New York: Da Capo Press. ISBN 978-0-3068079-3-0.

== External links and further reading ==
- Media related to Walter Schellenberg at Wikimedia Commons
- Quotations related to Walter Schellenberg at Wikiquote
- World War II: Spying and Counterintelligence—Germany
- Stevens, Gordon (1991). And All The King's Men. Pan. ISBN 0-330-31534-X.
