= Werner Best =

German jurist and SS general (1903–1989)

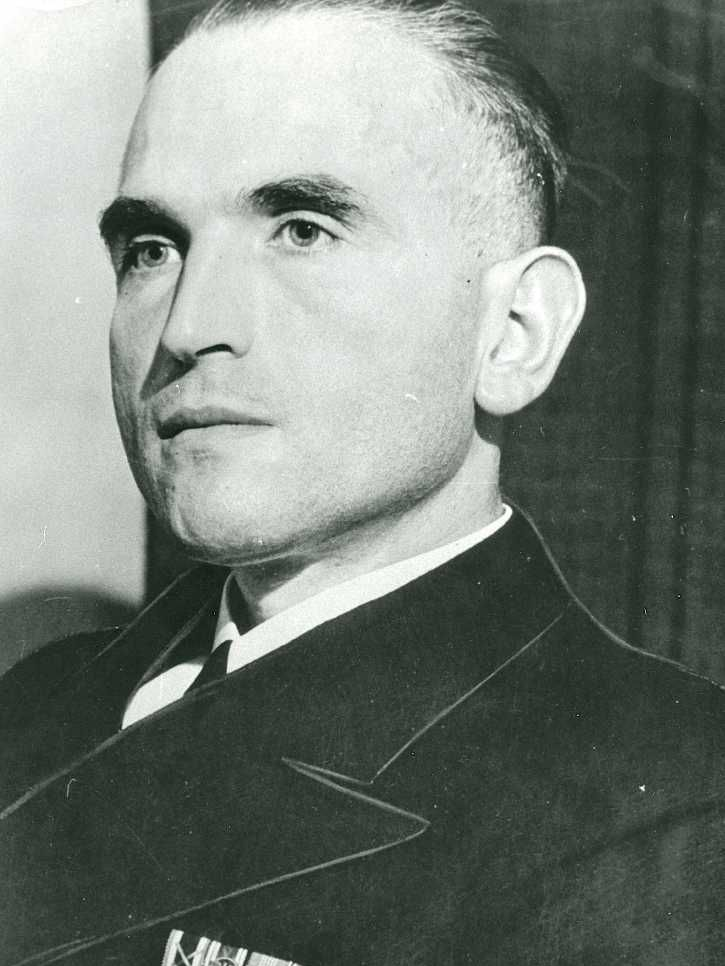
- Best in 1942

Reich's Plenipotentiary in Denmark
- In office November 1942 – 8 May 1945
- Preceded by: Cécil von Renthe-Fink
- Succeeded by: Office abolished

Personal details
- Born: Karl Rudolf Werner Best; 10 July 1903 Darmstadt, Grand Duchy of Hesse, German Empire
- Died: 23 June 1989 (aged 85) Mülheim, North Rhine-Westphalia, West Germany
- Party: Nazi Party
- Other political affiliations: Deutschvölkischer Schutz- und Trutzbund; German National People's Party
- Education: Goethe University Frankfurt; University of Freiburg; University of Giessen; University of Hanover; Heidelberg University
- Profession: Lawyer
- Awards: Golden Party Badge

Military service
- Allegiance: Nazi Germany
- Branch/service: Schutzstaffel
- Years of service: 1931–1945
- Rank: SS-Obergruppenführer
- Commands: Amt I, RSHA
- Battles/wars: World War II

Karl Rudolf Werner Best (10 July 1903 – 23 June 1989) was a German jurist, police chief, SS-Obergruppenführer, Nazi Party leader, and theoretician from Darmstadt. He was the first chief of Department 1 of the Gestapo, Nazi Germany's secret police, and initiated a registry of all Jews in Germany. As a deputy of SS-Obergruppenführer Reinhard Heydrich, he organized the SS-Einsatzgruppen paramilitary death squads that carried out mass-murder in Nazi-occupied territories.

Best served in the German military occupation administration of France (1940–1942) and then became the civilian administrator of occupied Denmark (1942–1945). Convicted of war crimes in Denmark, he was released from prison in 1951. Following his release, Best campaigned for amnesty for Nazi war criminals and against the abolition of the statute of limitations. He escaped further prosecution in West Germany in 1972 due to ill health and died in 1989, aged 85.

== Early life ==
Werner Best was born on 10 July 1903 in Darmstadt in Hesse where he attended Volksschule. When he was nine, his family moved to Dortmund where he attended the Gymnasium. His father was a postmaster who was killed in France at the outset of World War I in Autumn 1914. His mother then moved with her children to Mainz, where Best completed his secondary education and earned his Abitur in 1921. In 1919, Best founded a local group of the German National Youth League in Mainz and joined the local branch of the conservative German National People's Party. The next year, he joined the Deutschvölkischer Schutz- und Trutzbund, the largest and most active antisemitic organization in the Weimar Republic. Between 1921 and 1925, he studied law at the universities of Frankfurt am Main, Freiburg, Giessen and Hanover. He passed the first state law examination and worked as a trainee lawyer at courts and administrative offices in the Mainz area. After earning his doctorate of law from the University of Heidelberg in 1927, he passed the second state law examination and qualified as an Assessor in November 1928.

Owing to his political resistance activities against the French occupation of the Ruhr, Best had been arrested and briefly imprisoned in 1924. In 1930, he joined the Nazi Party (NSDAP) and by 1931—before the Nazis assumed power—he was already a member of the Schutzstaffel (SS). (Note: Best's NSDAP Party member number was 341,338 and his SS membership number, 23,377.) As an early Party member, Best later would be awarded the Golden Party Badge. In August 1931, he was elected as a deputy to the Landtag of the federal state of Hesse where he served until its dissolution in October 1933. Also in 1931, he was forced out of the judicial service in Hesse following the discovery of the Boxheim Documents, (Note: These documents contained contingency SA plans for a violent takeover—which included food rationing, the abolition of money, compulsory labour for all, and the death penalty for disobedience by the Nazis—in the event of a Communist uprising in Hesse. Once discovered, Adolf Hitler distanced himself from the affair. The ordeal elicited a ban on political uniforms by then chancellor of the Weimar Republic, Heinrich Brüning, who then convinced President Paul von Hindenburg to ban the SA altogether.) which were blueprints for a Nazi putsch he had written.

== The Nazi state and World War II ==
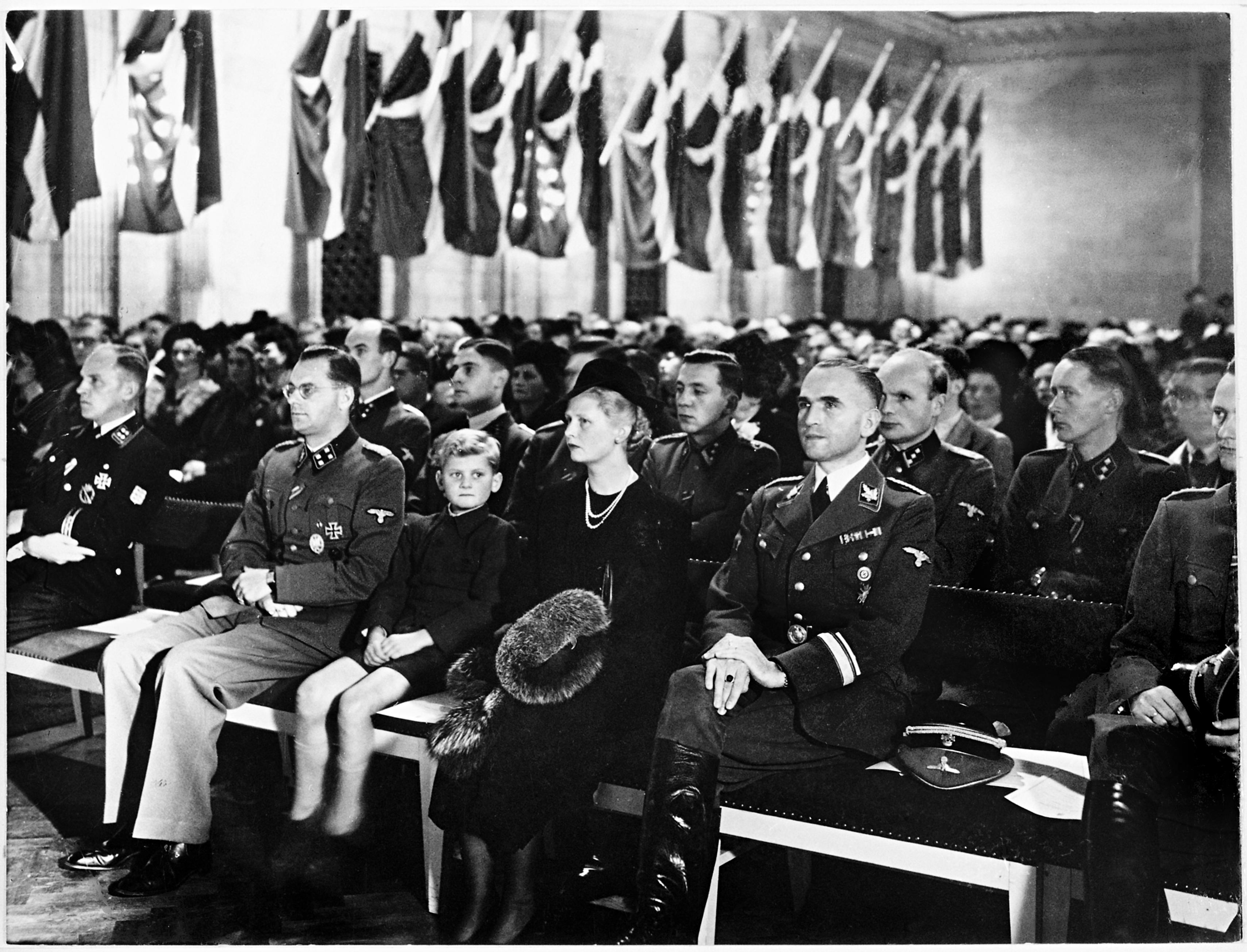
Best participating in the commemoration for fallen members of the Free Corps Denmark, Copenhagen 17 October 1943

As a trained lawyer, Heydrich and Himmler counted on Best throughout the 1930s for his skills in conceptualizing and justifying Nazi law, which helped provide the SS-police apparatus with its nearly unrestricted power over German society. Best became a member of the Academy for German Law (German: Akademie für deutsches Recht (ADR)) and the chairman of its Committee on Police Law, where he worked alongside the future SS-Oberführer Reinhard Höhn. (Note: Historian Dennis Anderson writes, "Rather than trying to reactivate the old [1934] committee [for police law], the ADR decided to reformulate it, with Werner Best, a high official in the State Secret Police office (Gestapa)[sic] and a leading Gestapo lawyer as chairman and Professor Reinhard Höhn of Berlin's Institute for State Research as his deputy.")

Best appeared dedicated to the national-racial cause of the Nazis and typified the ideal administrator for its terror apparatus. Historian Frank Trentmann wrote that "Best personified the technocratic Nazi, cold and functional". Correspondingly, Best quickly rose to the rank of SS-Brigadeführer and became chief of Department 1 of the Gestapo, which was in charge of organization, administration, and legal affairs. He was a deputy to Reinhard Heydrich. Both men saw the Gestapo as actually working on "behalf of the German people" through both "ethnic and political purification". By 1934, Ernst Röhm's increasing political influence over the powerful Nazi paramilitary organisation, the Sturmabteilung (SA), was seen as a threat by Hitler, who ordered its elimination as an independent political force. On 30 June 1934, the SS and Gestapo implemented Hitler's plan and carried out mass arrests that continued for two days. While Heydrich coordinated the operation from Berlin, Best was sent to Munich to "oversee a wave of arrests" in the southern part of Germany. The purge became known as the Night of the Long Knives. Up to 200 people, including Röhm, were killed in the action.

Even though Canadian historian Robert Gellately wrote that most Gestapo men were not Nazis, at the same time, they were not opposed to the Nazi regime and willingly served in whatever task they were called upon to perform. Over time, membership in the Gestapo included ideological indoctrination, particularly once Best assumed a leading role for training in April 1936. Employing biological metaphors, Best emphasized a doctrine that encouraged members of the Gestapo to view themselves as 'doctors' to the national body in the struggle against "pathogens" and "diseases"; among the implied sicknesses were "communists, Freemasons, and the churches—and above and behind all these stood the Jews." Heydrich thought along similar lines and advocated both defensive and offensive measures on the part of the Gestapo, so as to prevent any subversion or destruction of the Nazi body.

On 27 September 1939, the SD and SiPo (made up of the Gestapo and the Kripo) were folded into the new Reich Security Main Office (Reichssicherheitshauptamt; RSHA), which was placed under Heydrich's control. Best was made head of Amt I (Department I) of the RSHA: Administration and Legal. That department dealt with the legal and personnel issues/matters of the SS and security police. Heydrich and Heinrich Himmler relied on Best to develop and legally justify the activities against enemies of the state, especially those aimed at Jews. In 1939 Best became one of the directors of Heydrich's foundation, the Stiftung Nordhav, and was placed in command of choosing leaders for the Einsatzgruppen task forces and their subgroups (the Einsatzkommandos) from among educated people with military experience; many of them former members of the Freikorps.

Werner Best lost a power struggle within the RSHA, and had to leave Berlin in 1940. With the military grade of War Administration Chief (Kriegsverwaltungschef), Best was appointed chief of the Section "Administration" (Abteilung Verwaltung) of the Administration Staff (Verwaltungsstab, Dr Schmid) under then (Militärbefehlshaber in Frankreich or MBF) "Military Commander in France", General Otto von Stülpnagel in occupied France. Best held this position until 1942. (Note: This function was less important than the one Best had had in the RSHA. The Military Command in France had two Staffs: Administration and Command (Kommandostab); the Administration Staff had four Sections: "Central"; "Administration"; "Economy"; "War Economy". Ref.: La France pendant la Seconde Guerre mondiale. Atlas historique, Éditions Fayard (2010).)

In his efforts as the RSHA emissary in France, Best's unit drew up radical plans for a total reorganization of Western Europe based on racial principles; he sought to unite Netherlands, Flanders and French territory north of the river Loire into the Reich, turn Wallonia and Brittany into German protectorates, merge Northern Ireland with the Irish Free State, create a decentralized British federation and break Spain into independent entities of Galicia, Basque Country and Catalonia.

After the November 1942 Telegram Crisis, Best was appointed the Third Reich's Plenipotentiary (Reichsbevollmächtigter) in occupied Denmark, which gave him supervisory control of civilian affairs there. Meanwhile, King Christian X, unlike most heads of state under Nazi German occupation, remained in office, along with the Danish Parliament, cabinet (a coalition of national unity) and courts. When the Nazis attempted to deport Denmark's Jews, the cabinet and Christian X objected. (Note: About 7,200 Jews and 700 of their non-Jewish relatives were safely transported to Sweden thanks to the efforts of Denmark's leadership.)

Best kept his position in Denmark until the end of the war in May 1945, even after the German military commander, Hermann von Hanneken—who had been encouraged by Hitler to rule Denmark with an iron hand—had assumed direct control over its administration on 29 August 1943.

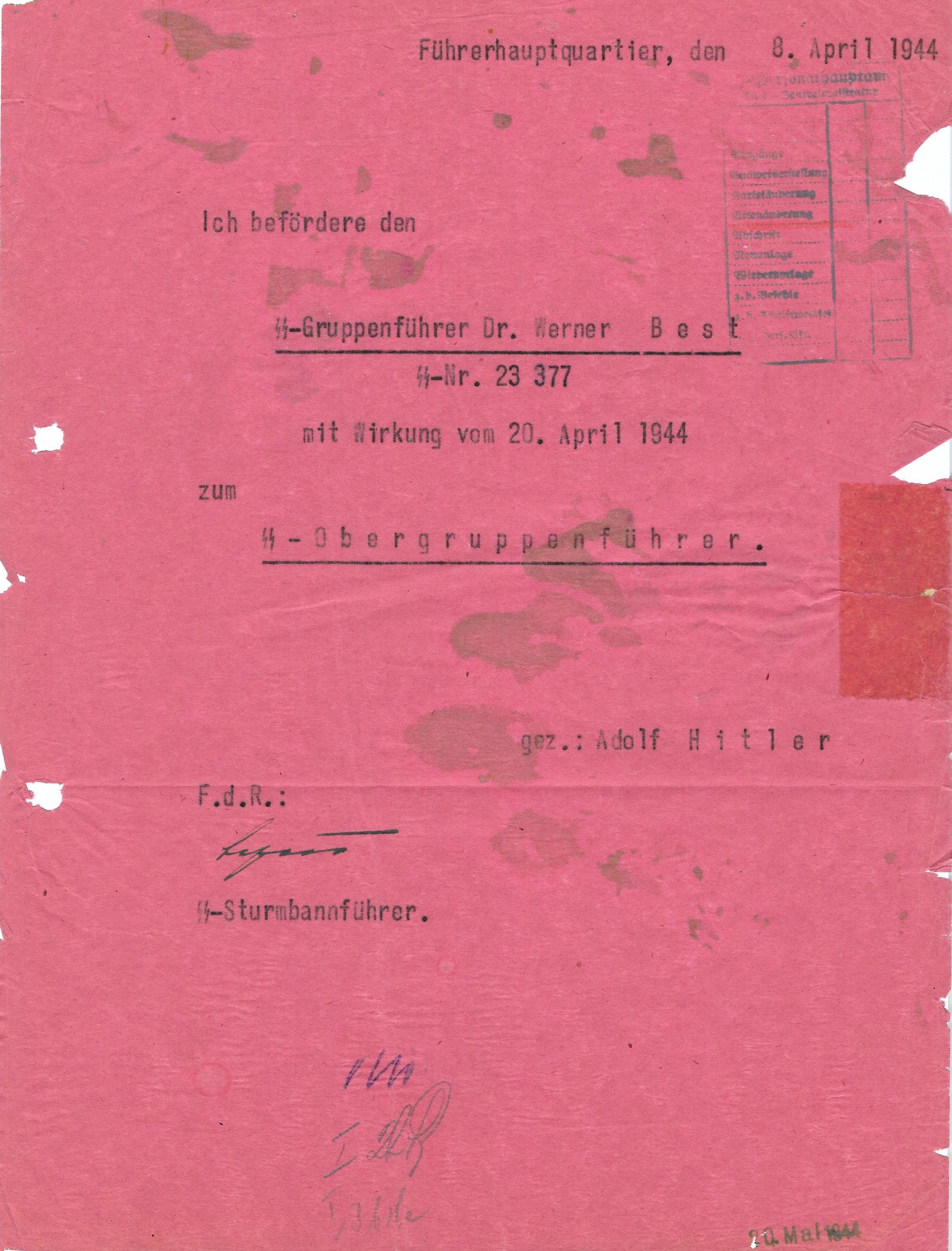
Best's 1944 carbon promotion document from his personal SS file

== Administration by the Permanent Secretaries ==
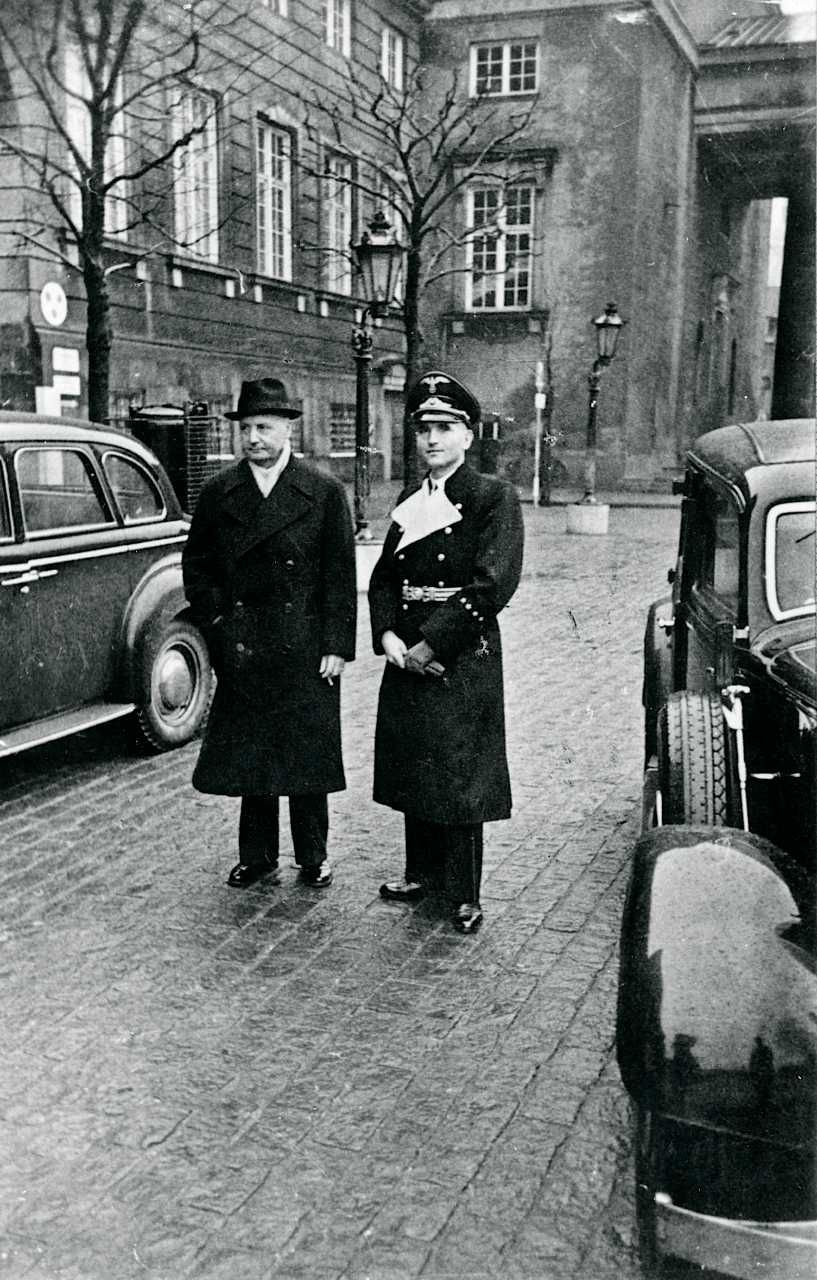
Best (right) with Erik Scavenius, Danish PM 1942-1943

In compliance with the Danish cabinet's decision on 9 April 1940 to accept cooperation with German authorities, the Danish police did cooperate with German occupation forces. This arrangement remained in effect even after the Danish government resigned on 29 August 1943. On 12 May 1944, Best demanded that the Danish police should assume responsibility for protection of 57 enterprises the Germans deemed at risk of sabotage by the Danish resistance movement, which was growing in strength. Should the Danish civil administration not do so, total Danish police strength would be reduced to 3,000 men. Nils Svenningsen, who functioned as de facto head of the Danish civil administration in the absence of a Danish government, was inclined to accept this demand, but the organizations of the Danish police opposed it.

Following rejection of the German request, a state of emergency was declared in Denmark on 29 August 1943. Then on 19 September 1944, the German army began arresting members of the Danish police forces; 1,984 policemen out of 10,000 were arrested and deported to German concentration and prisoner-of-war camps, most of them to Buchenwald.

To avoid deportation of Danes to German concentration camps, the permanent secretary of the ministry of foreign affairs, Nils Svenningsen, in January 1944 proposed establishment of an internment camp within Denmark. Best accepted this proposal, but on condition that the camp be built close to the German border. Frøslev Prison Camp was opened in August 1944.

Best also possibly sabotaged the rounding up of the Jewish population in Denmark in order to avoid agitating the general Danish population. In the Rescue of the Danish Jews, the primary escape route was to cross Øresund to Sweden by boat. At the most critical time, all German patrol boats of the area were ordered into harbor for three weeks for new paint jobs. Best may have tipped off his Jewish tailor about this development—but Danish authorities credit Best's right-hand man, Georg Duckwitz—which contributed to the escape of a number of Jews. During his trial before Danish courts, Best insisted that the Jews were able to escape because he provided the dates to Duckwitz.

In deliberations on 3 May 1945 about preparation for the impending German defeat, Best fought to avoid implementation of a scorched earth policy in Denmark.

== Post-war ==
After the war, Best testified as a witness at the Nuremberg Trial of the Major War Criminals, during which he attempted to present the Gestapo as a harmless state organization that was subordinated to state leaders and was nearly undifferentiated from Germany's criminal police. Historian Frank McDonough characterized Best's testimony as a "revisionist interpretation of the Gestapo". For instance, Best claimed that the Gestapo primarily instituted investigations in response to reports from the general public and that only serious cases of treason warranted "enhanced interrogations" under strict guidelines, during which no confessions were ever extorted from the accused.

In 1948, Best was sentenced to death by a Danish court, but his sentence was reduced to 12 years on appeal. Best was released in 1951 as part of a Danish amnesty program for Nazi war criminals. Returning to Germany, he was employed by the law firm of Ernst Achenbach in Essen, advocating for an amnesty for German war criminals and other former Nazis. He also maintained contacts with members of the so-called Naumann Circle, such as Werner Naumann, Hans Fritzsche and Franz Six. In 1952, he co-authored with them a strong nationalist program intended to be used in their attempt to infiltrate the Free Democratic Party. It advocated a commitment to a unified German Reich by refusing to renounce the right of expelled Germans to return to their home territories, and also expressed opposition to punishments imposed on former German soldiers by the Allies.

In 1958 Best was fined 70,000 marks by a Berlin court for his actions as an SS officer during the war. In March 1969, Best was held in detention and in February 1972 he was charged again, when further war crimes allegations arose, but he was released in August 1972 on grounds that he was medically unfit to stand trial. After that, Best was part of a network that helped former Nazis and spent his time "campaigning for a general amnesty", and against the abolition of the statute of limitations for Nazi crimes. He died in Mülheim, North Rhine-Westphalia, on 23 June 1989.

== See also ==
- Glossary of Nazi Germany
- List of Nazi Party leaders and officials
- List of SS-Obergruppenführer
