= Frøslev Prison Camp =

Internment camp during WWII

Coordinates: 54°50′34.38″N 9°19′41.70″E

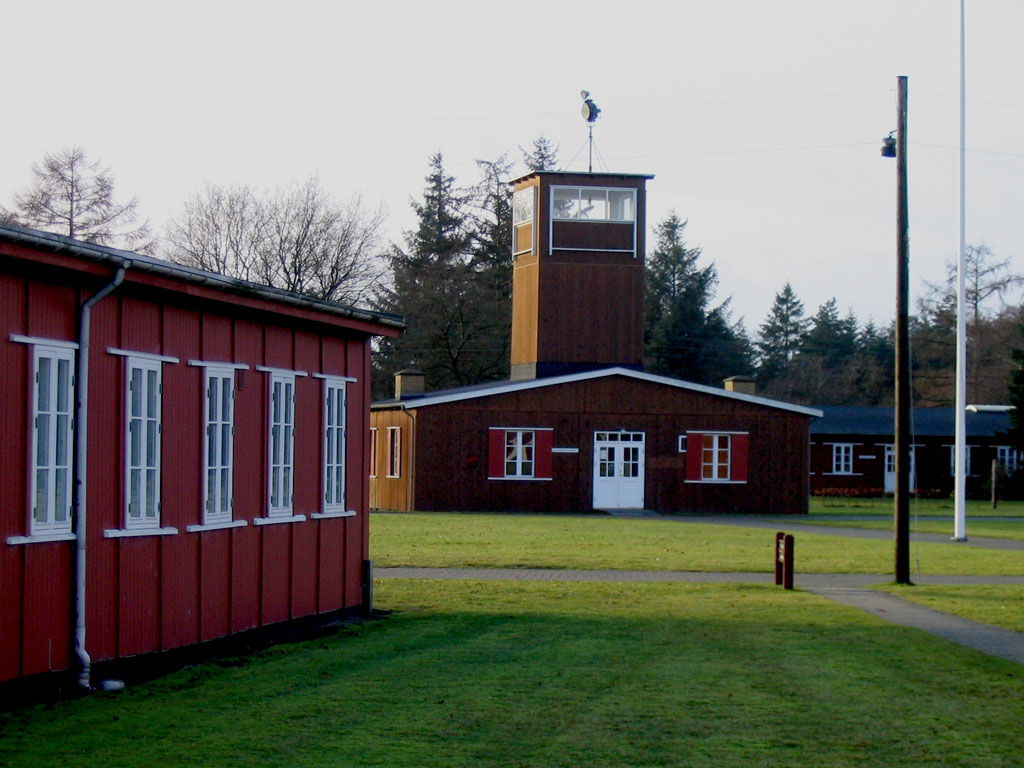
Central guard tower and barracks

Frøslev Camp (Danish: Frøslevlejren, German: Polizeigefangenenlager Fröslee) was an internment camp in German-occupied Denmark during World War II.

In order to avoid deportation of Danes to German concentration camps, Danish authorities suggested, in January 1944, that an internment camp be created in Denmark. The German occupation authorities consented, and the camp was erected near the village of Frøslev in the south-west of Denmark, close to the German border. From mid-August until the end of the German occupation in May 1945, 12,000 people had been imprisoned there. Most of them were suspected members of the Danish resistance movement, Communists and other political prisoners. Living conditions in the camp were generally tolerable, but about 1,600 internees were deported to German concentration camps, where about 220 of them died.

Towards the end of the war, the Swedish count Folke Bernadotte tried to get all Scandinavian concentration camp prisoners to Sweden. Simultaneously, the Danish administration negotiated with the Germans about returning the Danish prisoners in Germany. As a result of these efforts, many Scandinavian prisoners came with the White Buses from the German camps. In March and April 1945, 10,000 Danish and Norwegian captives were brought home from Germany. Some of the returning prisoners came to Frøslev Prison Camp. Among those were some of the 1,960 Danish policemen who had been arrested and deported on 19 September 1944.

== After the war ==
When the German occupation ended, the prisoners were released, and suspected Nazi collaborators, among them Frits Clausen, former leader of the Danish Nazi party, were instead interned in the camp, whose name was changed to Fårhus Camp (Fårhuslejren). The camp was now run by the Danish resistance movement. The Danish state later took over from the resistance movement, using the camp as the country's largest correctional facility for convicted collaborators.

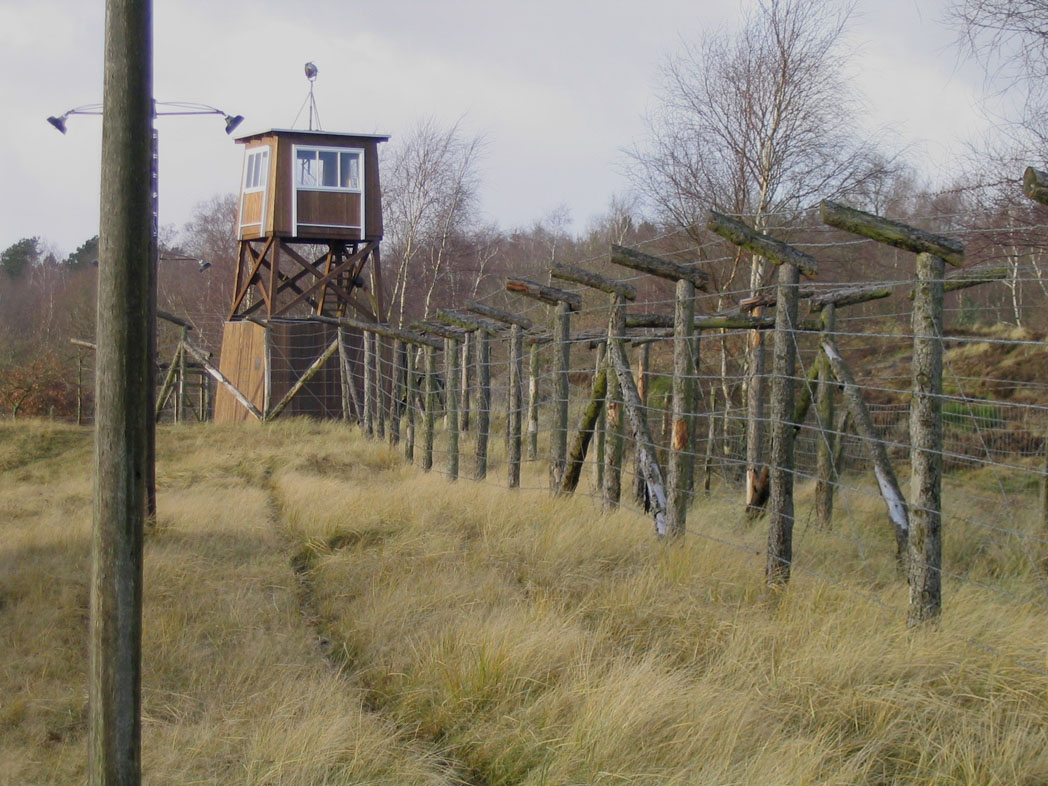
Fence and guard tower

By 1949 most collaborators had served their sentences, and the camp was converted to army barracks under the name of Padborg Camp (Padborglejren). The Frøslev Prison Camp Museum (Frøslevlejrens Museum) was inaugurated in 1969. A 2001 agreement established that the camp would be preserved as a national memorial park. Some parts of the original 1944–45 prison camp which had been demolished, including a watchtower and a portion of the barbed-wire fence, were reconstructed. The area also houses a residential continuation high school named Frøslevlejrens Efterskole.
