= Axis leaders of World War II =

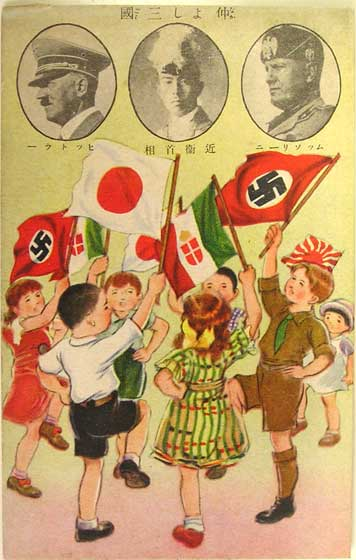
Japanese propaganda poster of the Shōwa era showing Adolf Hitler, Fumimaro Konoe and Benito Mussolini, the political leaders of the three main Axis powers in 1940

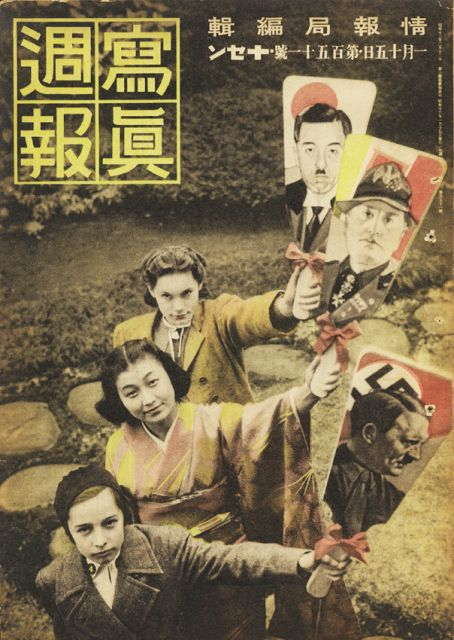
Japanese magazine published by the Cabinet Intelligence Bureau on 15 January 1941, advertised the Tripartite Pact

The Axis powers of World War II was established with the signing of the Tripartite Pact in 1940 and pursued a strongly militarist and nationalist ideology; with a policy of anti-communism. During the early phase of the war, puppet governments were established in their occupied nations. When the war ended, many of them faced trials for war crimes. The chief leaders were Adolf Hitler of Nazi Germany, Benito Mussolini of the Kingdom of Italy, and Hirohito of the Empire of Japan. Unlike what happened with the Allies, there was never a joint meeting of the main Axis heads of government, although Mussolini and Hitler met on a regular basis.

== Bulgaria ==
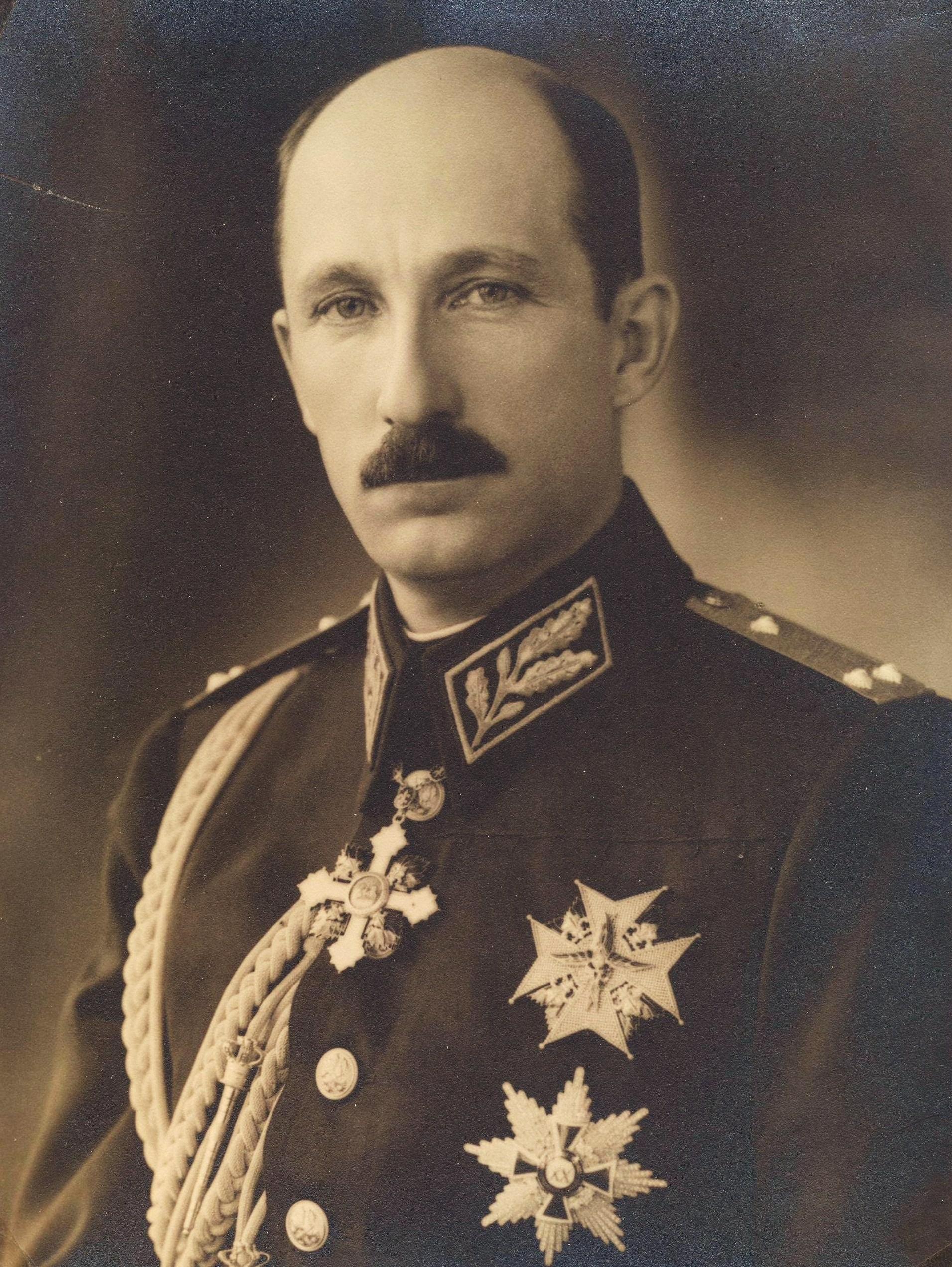
Tsar Boris III.

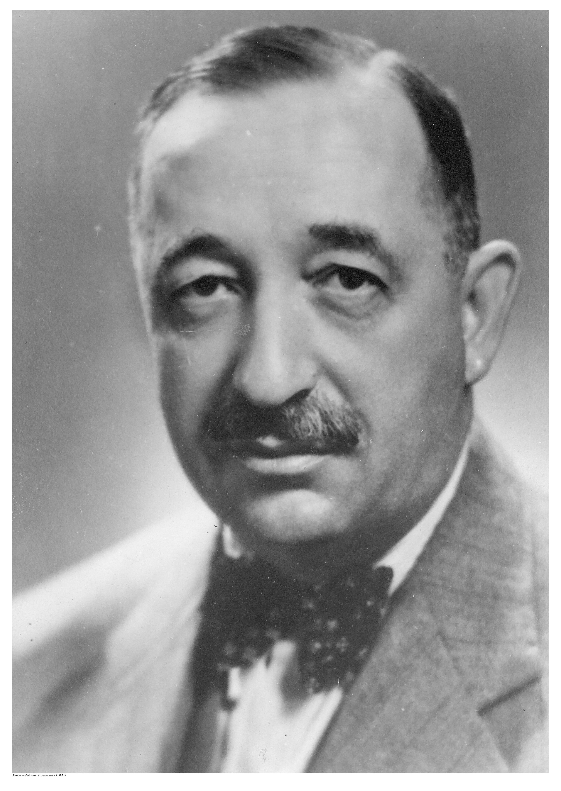
Bogdan Filov

- Boris III was the Tsar from 1918 until his death in 1943.
- Simeon II was Tsar of Bulgaria from 1943 until 1946, was underage and did not have any power.
- Prince Kiril of Bulgaria, head of the regency council, 1943–44.
- Bogdan Filov, prime minister, 1940–43, member of the regency council, 1943–44.
- Dobri Bozhilov, prime minister, 1943–44.
- Ivan Ivanov Bagryanov was prime minister in 1944. He attempted to pull Bulgaria out of the war and declare neutrality.
- Konstantin Muraviev, prime minister, 1944. Bulgarian Agrarian National Union.
- Aleksandar Tsankov, prime minister of the Bulgarian government-in-exile.
- Nikola Mihov was a lieutenant general, Minister of Defence of Bulgaria, member of the regency council, 1943-44.
- Constantine Lukasz was a lieutenant general, Chief of Staff of the Bulgarian Army
- Ferdinand Kozovski was a lieutenant-general in the Bulgarian Army who served as the Chairman of the National Assembly of Bulgaria from 1950 to 1965.
- Damyan Velchev was a Bulgarian colonel-general, Minister of Defence of Bulgaria.
- Vladimir Stoychev was a Bulgarian colonel-general, diplomat and horse rider.

== Germany ==
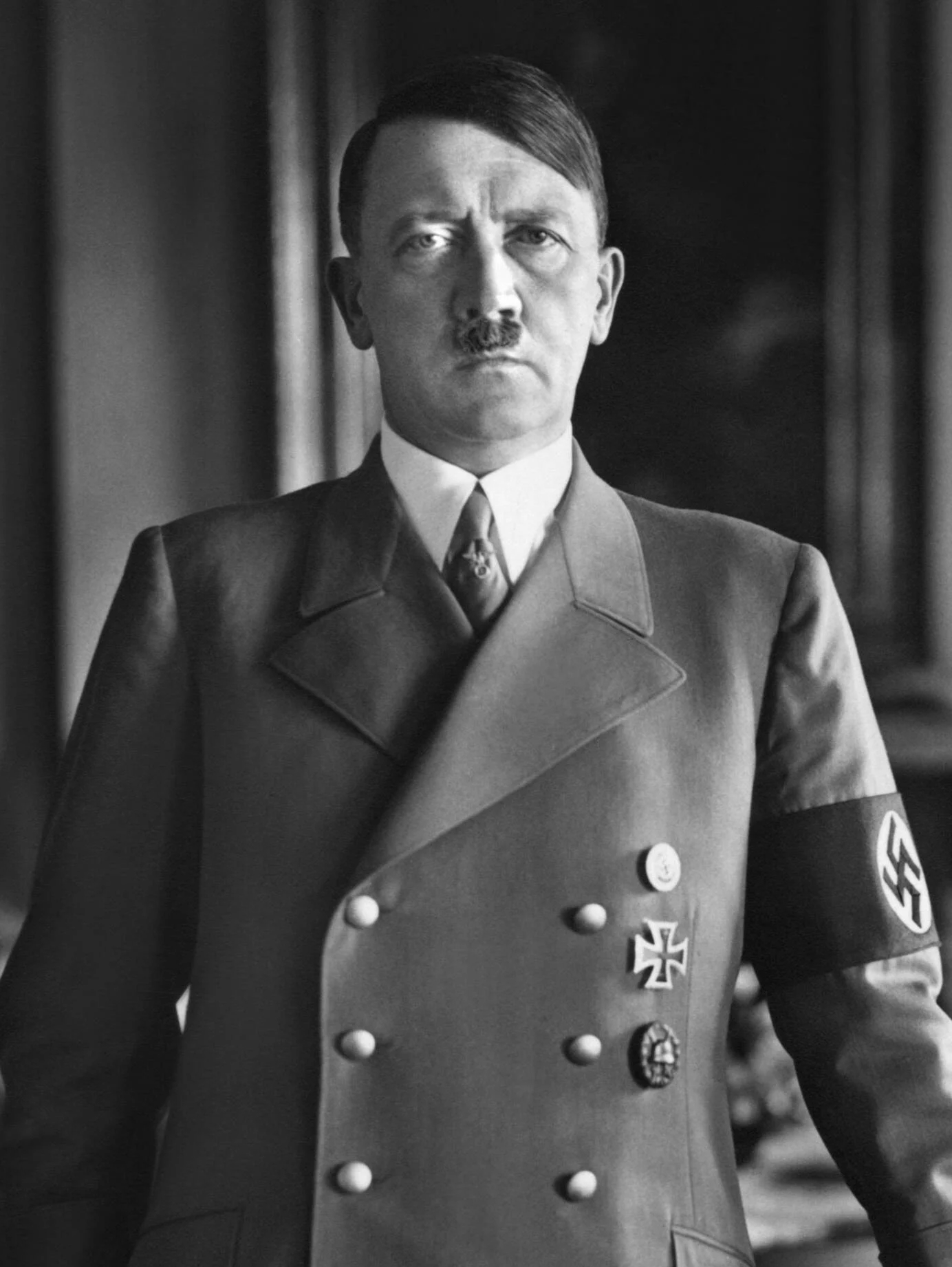
Adolf Hitler was the Austrian-born leader of the National Socialist German Workers Party

- Adolf Hitler was leader of Nazi Germany, first as Chancellor from 1933 until 1934. He later became Germany's Führer from 1934 until his suicide in 1945. Hitler came to power during Germany's period of crisis after the Great War which occurred between the 1920s and early 1930s. During his rule, Germany became a fascist state with a policy of anti-Semitism that led to the Holocaust. Hitler pursued an extremely aggressive foreign policy that triggered World War II. He committed suicide on April 30, 1945, along with Eva Braun, his long term mistress whom he had married less than 40 hours before their deaths.
- Joseph Goebbels was Minister for Public Enlightenment and Propaganda from 1933 until 1945. An avid supporter of the war, Goebbels did everything in his power to prepare the German people for a large-scale military conflict. He was one of Hitler's closest associates and most devout followers. After Hitler's suicide, Goebbels and his wife Magda had their six children poisoned and then also committed suicide. He became Chancellor for one day before his death.
- Hermann Göring was Reichsmarschall and Prime Minister of Prussia. Göring held a variety of public offices heaped upon him by Hitler. He was the commander-in-chief of the Luftwaffe, President of the Reichstag, Original Head of the Gestapo, Minister of Economics, Paramount Chief of the War Economy, Head of the Four Year Plan, Reichmarshall of the Greater German Reich, Minister of the Forests of the Third Reich and finally defendant Number 1 at the Nuremberg Trials. Hitler awarded Göring the Grand Cross of the Iron Cross for his successful leadership. Originally, Hitler's designated successor, and the second highest-ranking Nazi official. However, by 1942, with his power waning, Göring fell out of favor with the Führer, but continued to be the de jure second-in-command of the Third Reich. Göring was the highest-ranking Nazi official brought before the Nuremberg Trials. He committed suicide with cyanide before his sentence was carried out.
- Heinrich Himmler became the second-in-command of Nazi Germany following Göring's downfall after the repeated losses of the Luftwaffe which the Reichsmarshall commanded, as Supreme Commander of the Home Army and Reichsführer-SS. As commander of the Schutzstaffel (SS), Himmler also held overall command of the Gestapo. He was the chief architect of the "Final Solution" and through the SS was overseer of the Nazi concentration camps, extermination camps, and Einsatzgruppen death squads. He held final command responsibility for annihilating "subhumans" who were deemed unworthy of living. Shortly before the end of the war, he offered to surrender "Germany" to the Western Allies if he was spared from prosecution as a Nazi leader. Himmler committed suicide with cyanide after he became a captive of the British Army.
- Joachim von Ribbentrop was the German Minister of Foreign Affairs from 1938 to 1945. He was condemned to death at Nuremberg and hanged.
- Karl Dönitz was made Großadmiral of the Kriegsmarine on 30 January 1943 and was President for 23 days after Hitler's suicide. Under his command the U-boat fleet conducted unrestricted submarine warfare during the Battle of the Atlantic. After the war he was tried at Nuremberg and sentenced to ten years in prison.
- Lutz Graf Schwerin von Krosigk was Leading Minister of the German Reich in the short-lived Flensburg government in 1945.
- Martin Bormann was head of the Party Chancellery (Parteikanzlei) and private secretary to Adolf Hitler. He gained Hitler's trust and derived immense power within the Third Reich by controlling access to the Führer and by regulating the orbits of those closest to him.
- Rudolf Hess was Hitler's deputy in the Nazi Party. Hess hoped to score a stunning diplomatic victory by sealing a peace between the Third Reich and Britain. He flew to Scotland in an attempt to negotiate peace, but was arrested. He was tried at Nuremberg and sentenced to life imprisonment.
- Robert Ley was a member of the Nazi party who headed the German Labour Front from 1933 to 1945. He also held many other high positions in the Party, including Gauleiter, Reichsleiter (which is the second-highest political and military rank of the Nazi Party, next only to the office of Führer) and Reichsorganisationsleiter. He committed suicide while awaiting trial at Nuremberg for crimes against humanity and war crimes.
- Albert Speer was German Minister of Armaments from 1942 until the end of the war, in which position he was responsible for organizing most of the logistical aspects of Germany's war effort. He was tried at Nuremberg and sentenced to twenty years in prison.
- Alfred Rosenberg was a German philosopher and an influential ideologue of the Nazi Party. He is considered one of the main authors of key National Socialist ideological creeds, including its racial theory, persecution of the Jews, Lebensraum, abrogation of the Treaty of Versailles, and opposition to degenerate modern art. During the war he headed the NSDAP Office of Foreign Affairs and later the Reich Ministry for the Occupied Eastern Territories. After the war he was condemned to death at Nuremberg and hanged.
- Reinhard Heydrich was SS-Obergruppenführer (general) and General der Polizei, chief of the Reich Security Main Office (including the Gestapo, Kripo, and SD) and Stellvertretender Reichsprotektor (Deputy/Acting Reich-Protector) of Bohemia and Moravia (in what is now the Czech Republic). Heydrich served as president of the ICPC (later known as Interpol) and was one of the main architects of the Holocaust. He died of wounds from an assassination attempt in Prague 1942.
- Ernst Kaltenbrunner was an SS-Obergruppenführer. He was appointed by Himmler as chief of the SD (Sicherheitsdienst) in January 1943, the SiPo, (Sicherheitspolizei) made up of the combined forces of the Gestapo (secret state police) and the Kripo (Kriminalpolizei) and the RSHA (Reichssicherheitshauptamt); after Reinhard Heydrich's assassination. Further, Kaltenbrunner was in command of the Einsatzgruppen death squads. He was the highest-ranking SS leader to face trial at Nuremberg and be executed.
- Wilhelm Canaris was a German admiral, and chief of the Abwehr, the German military intelligence service, from 1935 to 1944. During the Second World War, he was among the military officers involved in the clandestine opposition to Adolf Hitler and the Nazi regime. He was executed in the Flossenbürg concentration camp for the act of high treason.
- Wilhelm Keitel was an army general and the chief of the OKW, the Oberkommando der Wehrmacht or High Command of the German Military, throughout the war. He was condemned to death at Nuremberg for the commission of war crimes and hanged.
- Alfred Jodl was an army general and operations chief of the OKW throughout the war. Like his chief, Keitel, he was condemned to death at Nuremberg and hanged.
- Franz Halder was a German general and the chief of the OKH, Oberkommando des Heeres, from 1938 until September 1942, when he was dismissed after frequent disagreements with Hitler.
- Kurt Zeitzler was a German general and the chief of the OKH, from 1942 until July 1944.
- Walther von Brauchitsch was commander-in-chief of the Wehrmacht from 1940 until his dismissal in December 1941, when Hitler took personal command of the army.
- Erich Raeder was Großadmiral of the Kriegsmarine (Navy) from 1 April 1939 until 30 January 1943.
- Fedor von Bock served as the commander of Army Group North during the Invasion of Poland in 1939 and commander of Army Group B during the Invasion of France in 1940. Following the invasion of the Soviet Union in 1941, he was named commander of Army Group Center and commanded Operation Typhoon, the ultimately failed attempt to capture Moscow during the winter of 1941. His final command was that of Army Group South in 1942 before being dismissed by Hitler. He was killed by British aircraft on May 4, 1945.
- Albert Kesselring was a German Luftwaffe general. He served as commander of Luftflotte 2 for the early part of the war, commanding air campaigns in west and east, before being assigned as commander-in-chief of German forces in the Mediterranean, a position he would occupy for most of the war, commanding German forces in the defense of Italy. In March 1945, he became the last German commander-in-chief in the west.
- Robert Ritter von Greim was a German Generalfeldmarschall (field marshal) and pilot. Greim was the commander of a Luftflotte (Air Fleet) which took part in the Invasion of Poland, the Battle for Norway and the Battle of Britain. His greatest tactical achievement was his Luftflotte's involvement in the Battle of Kursk and his planes' bombing of the Orel bulge during Operation Kutuzov. He was also one of the principal commanders of Operation Weserübung, The Blitz, Western Front, Battle of Berlin and Operation Barbarossa. At the end of the war he was appointed the supreme commander of the Luftwaffe after Göring had been dismissed for treason. After the surrender of Nazi Germany in May 1945, Greim was captured by the Allies. He committed suicide in prison on 24 May 1945.
- Gerd von Rundstedt was a Generalfeldmarschall (field marshal) in the German army and held some of the highest field commands in all phases of the war. He commanded large formations during the invasion of Poland and Battle of France. During Operation Barbarossa, he was named commander of Army Group South. In 1942 he was appointed commander of OB West. He retained this command (with several interruptions) until his dismissal by Hitler in March 1945.
- Erich von Manstein is credited with the drawing up of the Ardennes invasion plan of France. In the Soviet campaign, he also conquered Sevastopol in 1942 and was then made Generalfeldmarschall and took command of Army Group South. A command he held until he was dismissed by Hitler in March 1944. He is often considered one of the finest German strategists and field commanders of World War II.
- Heinz Guderian was the principal creator of Blitzkrieg. He commanded several front line armies in the early years of the war, most notably Panzergruppe Guderian during Operation Barbarossa. Guderian later served as chief of staff of the army from July 1944 to March 1945.
- Erwin Rommel was the commander of the Afrika Korps in the North African campaign and became known by the nickname "The Desert Fox". Rommel was admired as a tactical genius by both Axis and Allied leaders during the war. He was subsequently in command of the German forces during the battle of Normandy. He was forced to commit suicide on October 14, 1944, for being implicated in the July 20th plot against Hitler.
- Walter Model was a general in the German army who became best known as a skilled practitioner of defensive warfare on both the Eastern and Western Fronts. Following the invasion of Normandy in June 1944 he was reassigned to the west where he took command of Army Group B. He was also the principal architect of the Ardennes Offensive. He committed suicide on April 21, 1945.
- Hans-Jürgen von Arnim was a German colonel general and commander-in-chief of the Army Group Africa and de facto commander of the Afrika Korps from March 9, 1943, until his capture by the British Indian Army's 14th Infantry Division on May 12, 1943.
- Arthur Seyss-Inquart was an Austrian Nazi politician and convicted war criminal who served as Chancellor of Austria in 1938 for two days before the Anschluss. His positions in Nazi Germany included deputy governor to Hans Frank in the General Government of Occupied Poland, and Reichskommissar for the German-occupied Netherlands. He was condemned to death at Nuremberg for the commission of war crimes and hanged.

== Hungary ==
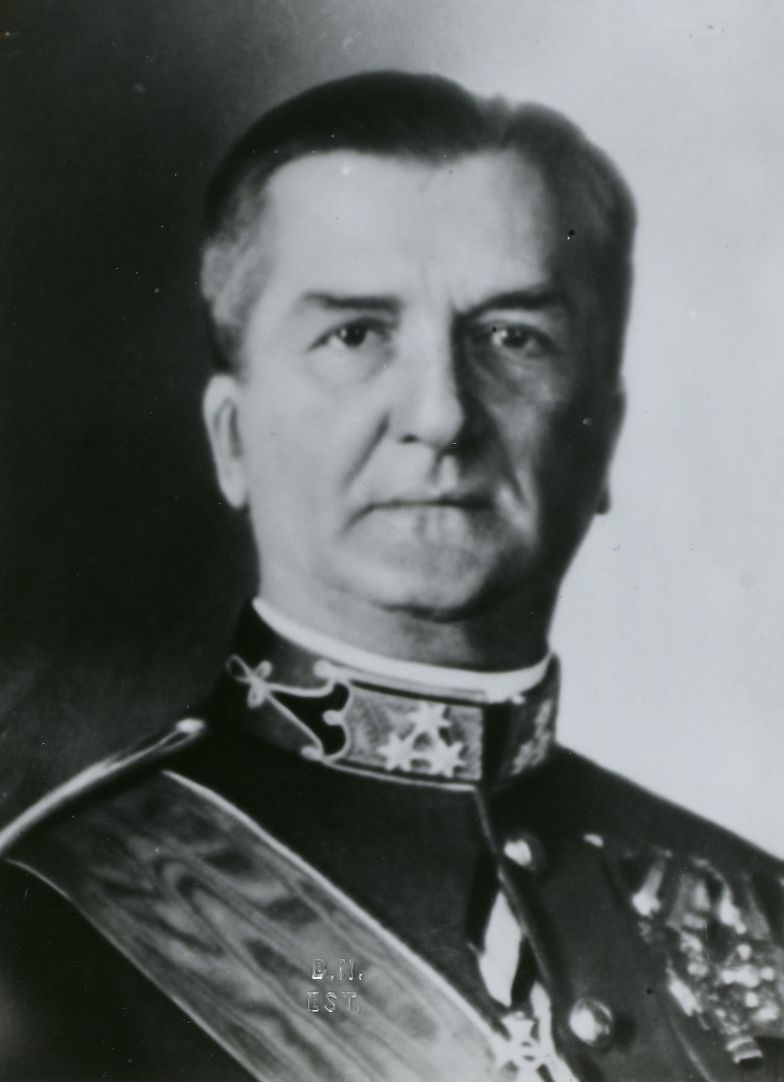
Regent Miklós Horthy of Hungary

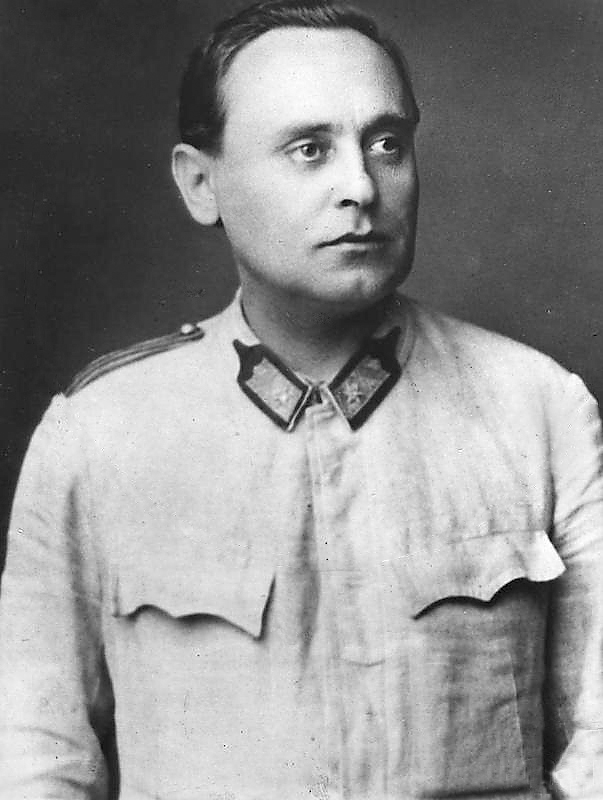
Ferenc Szálasi

- Miklós Horthy was the supreme regent (head of state) from 1920 until 1944.
- István Horthy was the deputy of the regent in 1942.
- László Bárdossy was his prime minister from 1941 until 1942. After World War II, Bárdossy was tried by a People's Court in November 1945. He was sentenced to death and executed in 1946.
- Miklós Kállay was prime minister from 1942 until 1944.
- Döme Sztójay was prime minister from March until August 1944. Sztójay was captured by American troops and extradited to Hungary in October 1945, after which time he was tried by a Communist People's Tribunal in Budapest. He was sentenced to death and executed in 1946.
- Géza Lakatos was a general in the Hungarian Army during World War II who served briefly as prime minister, under governor Miklós Horthy from August 29, 1944, until October 15 the same year.
- Ferenc Keresztes-Fischer was the Minister of the Interior of Hungary from 1938 to 1944. He was also the Ispán of Baranya, Pécs, and Somogy counties.
- Ferenc Szálasi was the leader of the fascist Arrow Cross Party, the "Leader of the Hungarian Nation" (Nemzetvezető), and the prime minister from 1944 to 1945. He was tried by the People's Tribunal in Budapest. He was sentenced to death and executed in 1946.
- Béla Miklós was acting as prime minister, at first in opposition, from 1944 to 1945.
- Károly Bartha was a colonel general, Minister of Defence.
- Ferenc Feketehalmy-Czeydner
- Ferenc Szombathelyi was a colonel general, chief of the General Staff.
- Ferenc Farkas de Kisbarnak
- Iván Hindy was a colonel-general in the Hungarian Army. He orchestrated the defence of Budapest. Hindy was captured by the Soviets On February 11, 1945, when he tried to escape just prior to the fall of the city on February 13. He was sentenced to death and executed in 1946.
- Gusztáv Jány was the commander of the Hungarian forces at the Battle of Stalingrad.
- Zoltán Szügyi was the commander of the Szent László Infantry Division.
- László Háry was the commander of the Hungarian Air Force.
- Elemér Gorondy-Novák was the commander of the Hungarian Third Army.
- Károly Beregfy was Szálasi's defence minister during the Arrow Cross Government.
- József Gera was the Arrow Cross Party's main ideologue.
- Gábor Vajna was Szálasi's interior minister during the Arrow Cross Government.

== Italy ==
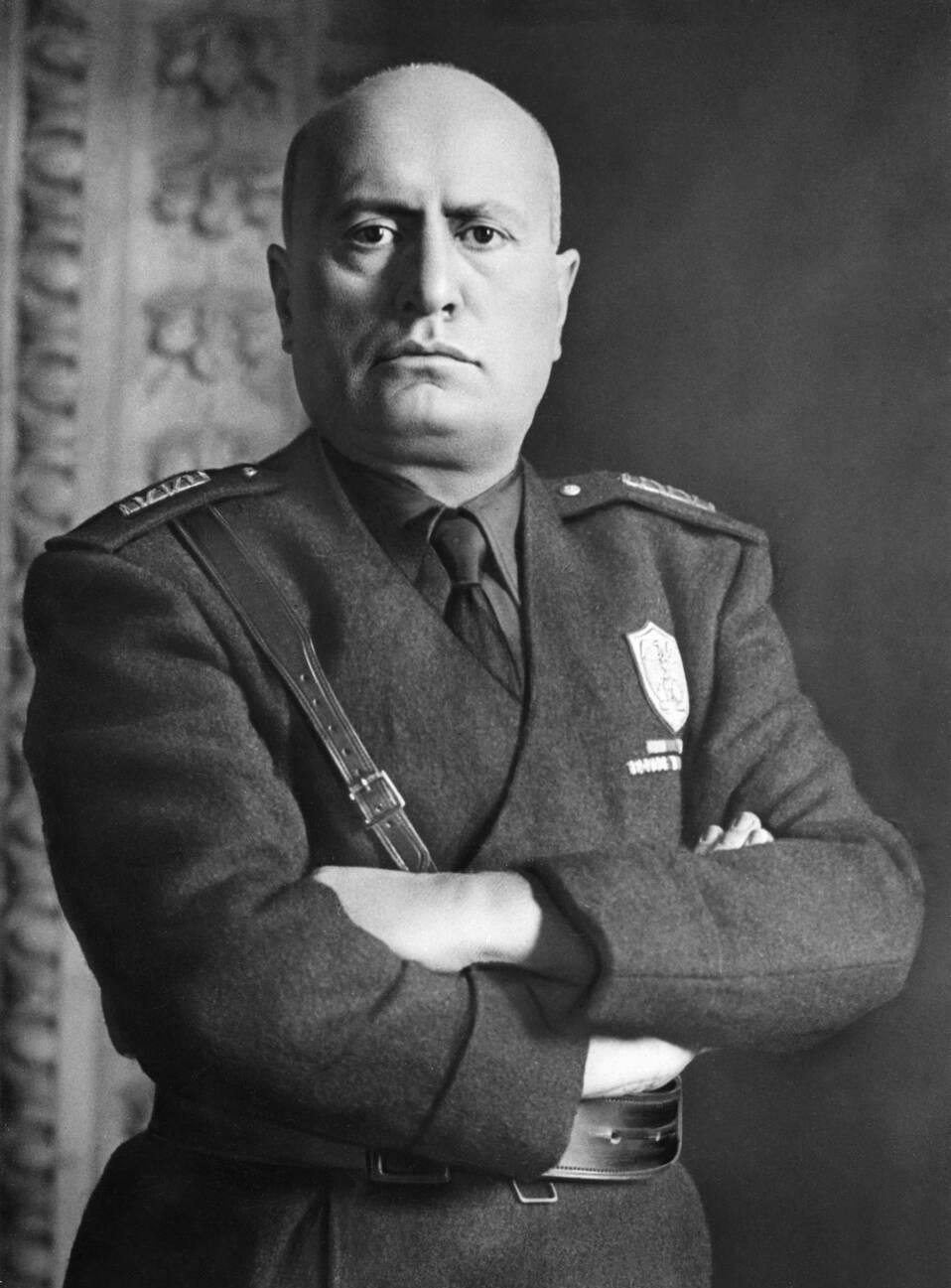
Benito Mussolini, prime minister, Duce and leader of the National Fascist Party.

- Benito Mussolini was Prime Minister of the Kingdom of Italy from 1922 to 1943. The founder of fascism, Mussolini made Italy the first fascist state, using the ideas of nationalism, militarism, anti-communism and anti-socialism combined with state propaganda. In 1925, he assumed dictatorial powers as the Duce ("Leader") of Fascism, and was subsequently called Duce by his Fascist supporters. From 1925, King Victor Emmanuel III delegated his powers to Mussolini and opposition to Mussolini and the Fascist state was seen as treason. Though his regime influenced Adolf Hitler and Nazi Germany, Mussolini did not subscribe to Nazi racial theories, dismissing them as mythical and fabricated. Only in 1938, under increased pressure from Hitler, did he adopt anti-Semitism as a state policy, and opposed the deportation of Jews by the Germans from Italian territory. Mussolini was the official head of the Milizia Volontaria per la Sicurezza Nazionale, MVSN ("Volunteer Militia for National Security"), often called the "Blackshirts", who were Fascist partisans loyal specifically to him, rather than the King. Successive military defeats from 1941, culminating in the Battle of El Alamein in 1942 and the Allied invasion of Sicily in July 1943, led to Mussolini and his government's dissolution and dismissal by the King. Arrested on the orders of the King, Mussolini was rescued by the Germans and became the puppet Head of State of the Italian Social Republic (regime under control of Nazi Germany) in northern Italy. Mussolini was executed by Italian partisans on 28 April 1945, while attempting to flee to Spain.
- Victor Emmanuel III of Italy was King of Italy and the supreme head, with Mussolini, of the Royal Italian Army, from 1935 he became Emperor of the Italian Empire. He supported Mussolini in 1922 during the March on Rome and he named him prime minister. In 1943, after successive military defeats, he, along with Marshal Pietro Badoglio, dissolved the Fascist government, dismissed and arrested Mussolini and arranged an armistice with the Allies, setting up a Royalist government in Southern Italy led by the Marshal.
- Pietro Badoglio was Marshal of the Army. He led the Italian Army during the Second Italo-Abyssinian War. He resigned in 1940 after the Italian failure in Greece. In 1943 he arranged with the Allies for an armistice and set up a Royalist government in Southern Italy (Brindisi).
- Ugo Cavallero was the head of the Italian Royal Army during the Second World War, his powers being delegated to him from the King, who was the official supreme commander of the Italian Royal Army. He led Italian forces during the Greco-Italian War in which Italian forces faltered badly.
- Italo Gariboldi was the commander of the Italian forces at the Battle of Stalingrad.
- Ettore Bastico was the overall commander of the Axis forces in North Africa from 1941 to 1943.
- Arturo Riccardi was the head of the Italian Royal Navy (Regia Marina) from 1940 to 1943, his powers being delegated to him from the King, who was the official supreme commander of the Italian Royal Navy.
- Inigo Campioni was a commander of the Italian Royal Navy during the battles of Taranto, Cape Spartivento, and Calabria.
- Angelo Iachino succeeded Campioni as commander of the Royal Italian Navy.
- Italo Balbo was the most important person of the Italian Royal Air Force (Regia Aeronautica) from the 1930s until his death in 1940. His powers were officially delegated to him from the King, who was the official supreme commander of the Italian Royal Air Force. He also commanded the Tenth army in Libya until his death.
- Galeazzo Ciano was appointed minister of foreign affairs in 1936 by Mussolini (who was also his father-in-law) and remained in that position until the end of the Fascist regime in 1943. Ciano signed the Pact of Steel with Germany in 1939 and subsequently the Tripartite Pact with Germany and Japan in 1940. Ciano attempted to convince Mussolini to bring Italy out of the war as casualties mounted but was ignored. In 1943, Ciano supported the ousting of Mussolini as prime minister. Ciano was later executed by Fascists in the Italian Social Republic for betraying Mussolini.
- Rodolfo Graziani was commander of Italian North Africa and Governor-General of Libya. Graziani was ordered to invade Egypt by Mussolini. Graziani expressed doubts about the ability of his largely un-mechanized force to defeat the British, however, he followed orders and the Tenth Army attacked on September 13. He resigned his commission in 1941 after being defeated by the British in Operation Compass. Graziani was the only one of the Italian marshals to remain loyal to Mussolini after Dino Grandi's Grand Council of Fascism coup, and was appointed Minister of Defense of the Italian Social Republic (Repubblica Sociale Italiana, or RSI). Graziani had under his command the mixed Italo-German LXXXXVII "Liguria" Army (Armee Ligurien) of the RSI.
- Giovanni Messe was the commander of the Italian Expeditionary Corps in Russia (Corpo di Spedizione Italiano in Russia, or CSIR). The CSIR fought on the Eastern Front, fighting with German forces against the Soviet Union. He later led Axis forces in the Tunisia Campaign. He is considered by many to be the best Italian general of the war.
- Mario Roatta was a general of the Italian army, best known for his role in Italian repression against civilians, in the Slovene and Croatian-inhabited areas of the Italian-occupied Yugoslavia.
- Alfredo Guzzoni was commander-in-chief of the Italian forces during the Allied Invasion of Sicily.
- Rino Corso Fougier was a general in the Royal Italian Air Force and Chief of Staff 1941–43.
- Giuseppe Fioravanzo was one of the "intellectuals" of the Regia Marina; he was one of the main authors of the development of Italian naval doctrine between the two World Wars.
- Junio Valerio Borghese was the commander of the Decima Flottiglia MAS.

== Japan ==
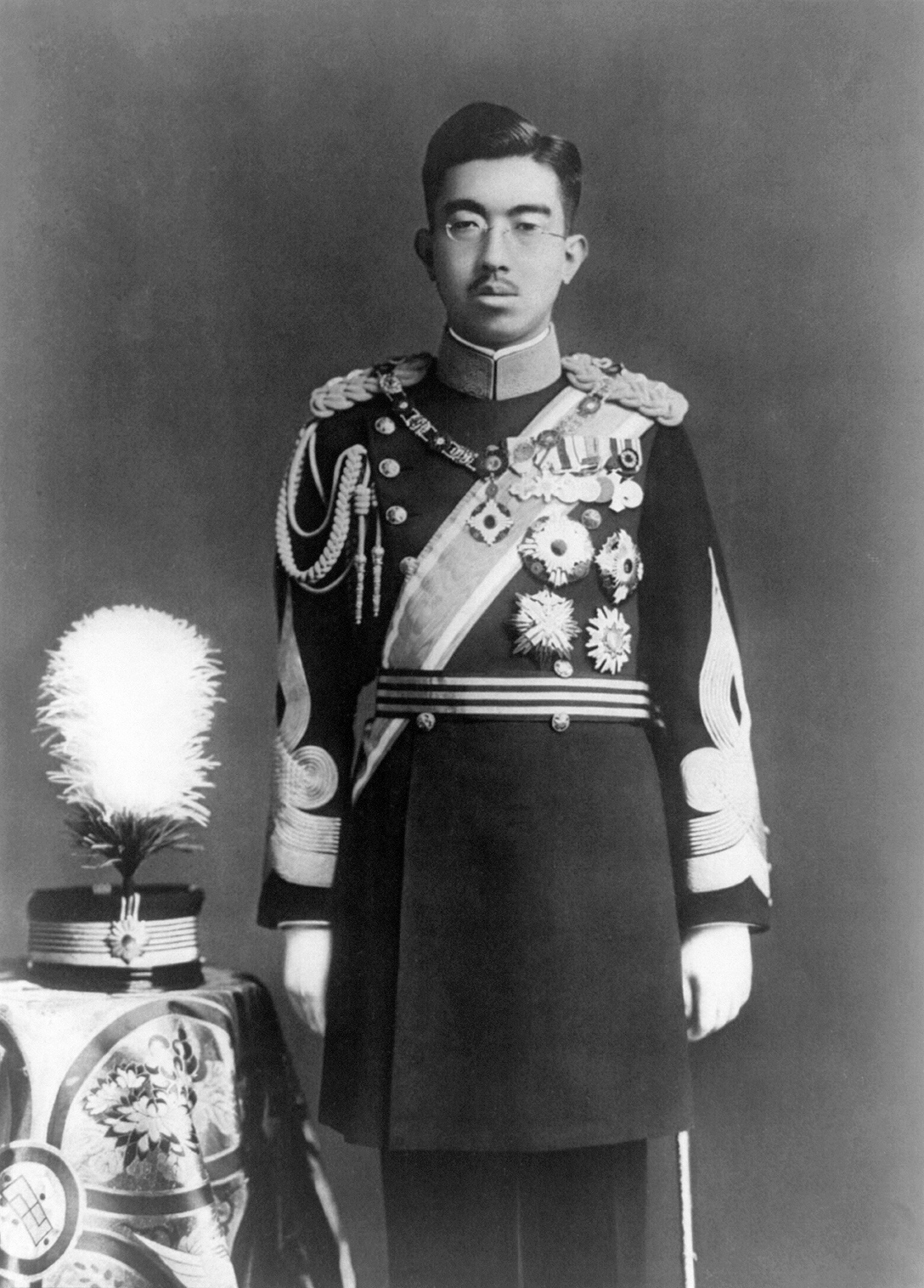
Hirohito, the Emperor of Japan

- Hirohito (posthumously known as Emperor Shōwa) was the Emperor from 1926 until his death in 1989, making him the last surviving leader of the big three (Germany, Italy, and Japan). He was viewed as a semi-divine leader. He was Commander of the Imperial General Headquarters from 1937 to 1945 and authorized in 1936, by imperial decree, the expansion of Shirō Ishii's bacteriological research unit, while, according to some authors, assuming control over the use of chemical and bacteriological weapons. His generals took the full blame and he was exonerated from criminal prosecution, with all members of the imperial family, by the Supreme Commander for the Allied Powers (SCAP).
- Fumimaro Konoe was prime minister from 1937 to 1939 and 1940 until 1941. Konoe authorized the publications of Kokutai no Hongi (1937) and Shinmin no Michi (1941). He joined the military in recommending to Emperor Shōwa the invasion of China and launched the National Spiritual Mobilization Movement, the League of Diet Members Believing the Objectives of the Holy War and the Taisei Yokusankai to promote a total war effort. Konoe was opposed to war with the Occidental powers. During the occupation of Japan, he refused to collaborate with the Supreme Commander of the Allied Powers to exonerate Hirohito and the imperial family of criminal responsibility and came under suspicion of war crimes. He committed suicide in 1945.
- Hiranuma Kiichirō was prime minister from 5 January 1939 to 30 August 1939. He was convicted of war crimes and sentenced to life imprisonment.
- Nobuyuki Abe was a general in the Imperial Japanese Army, Governor-General of Korea, and Prime Minister of Japan from 30 August 1939 to 16 January 1940.
- Mitsumasa Yonai was prime minister in 1940 and minister of the Navy from 1937 to 1939 and 1944 to 1945. During his second mandate as Navy minister, the Imperial Japanese Navy implemented the tokkōtai or suicide units against the Allied fleet. He cooperated with SCAP to fix the testimony of the senior officers accused in the Tokyo trials and was exonerated from criminal prosecutions.
- Hideki Tojo was minister of the Army in the second cabinet of Fumimaro Konoe from 1940 until 1944, and prime minister from 1941 until 1944. He was a strong supporter of the Tripartite Pact between Japan, Germany and Italy and a main proponent of the war against the Occidental powers. Tojo strengthened the Taisei Yokusankai to create a single-party state. He was demoted in July 1944 by the emperor, following the Battle of Saipan and condemned to death by the Tokyo tribunal and executed.
- Kuniaki Koiso was a senior army general who served as prime minister from July 1944 to April 1945.
- Kantarō Suzuki was an admiral who served as prime minister from April to August 1945. He agreed to Japan's surrender to the Allies on August 15, 1945.
- Sadao Araki was Minister of the Army from 1931 to 1933 and Education Minister from 1938 to 1939. Araki was one of the main proponents of militarism and expansionism during the Shōwa era. He developed the fascist ideas of the Kōdōha and led the National Spiritual Mobilization Movement to promote the Holy war against China. After the war Araki was tried and sentenced to life imprisonment but was released in 1955 with all the other major convicts.
- Kotohito Kanin was Chief of Staff of the Army from 1931 to 1940. During his mandate, the Army committed the Nanking massacre and regularly used chemical weapons in China. Kan'in was one of the main proponents of State Shinto. He died before the end of the war.
- Hajime Sugiyama was Minister of the Army from 1937 to 1938, then chief of staff from 1940 to 1944. During this period, the Army kept using chemical weapons and implemented the sanko sakusen. He committed suicide in 1945.
- Hisaichi Terauchi was a Marshal in the Imperial Japanese Army and the Commander of the Southern Expeditionary Army Group from 1941 to 1945, overseeing all IJA operations across South-East Asia and the South-West Pacific. He surrendered at the end of the war and died of a stroke in 1946, while a prisoner of war.
- Masaharu Homma was a general in the Imperial Japanese Army, most noted for his victory in conquering the Philippines in the Philippines Campaign.
- Yoshijirō Umezu was Commander of the Kwantung Army from 1939 to 1944, and was the Chief of Staff of the Army from 1944 to 1945. He was sentenced by the Tokyo Tribunal to life imprisonment in 1948, and died of cancer in prison the following year.
- Otozō Yamada was the final Commander of the Kwantung Army from 1944 to 1945. Taken prisoner in Manchuria by the Red Army at the end of the war, he was sentenced at the Khabarovsk War Crime Trials to 25 years in a Soviet labor camp for war crimes primarily related to the activities of Unit 731, but was released in 1956 and repatriated to Japan.
- Tomoyuki Yamashita was lieutenant-general of the Japanese Imperial Army from 1905 to 1945. He was most famous for conquering the British colonies of Malaya and Singapore, earning the nickname "The Tiger of Malaya". He was hanged on 23 February 1946.
- Hiroyasu Fushimi was Chief of Staff of the Navy from 1932 to 1941. Starting in 1937, the Imperial Japanese Navy Air Service implemented strategic bombing of Chinese cities such as Shanghai and Guangzhou. He was exonerated from criminal prosecutions with all members of the imperial family by SCAP.
- Osami Nagano was Chief of Staff of the Navy from 1941 to 1944. During this period, the Imperial Japanese Navy Air Service committed the attack of Pearl Harbor and the strategic bombing of Chongqing. He was tried before the Tokyo tribunal but died in prison before his sentence was carried out.
- Isoroku Yamamoto was Commander-in-Chief of the Imperial Japanese Navy from 1939 to 1943 and was responsible for Japan's early naval victories, including the attack on Pearl Harbor. Considered the most brilliant Japanese naval commander of the war, his death in 1943 deprived the military of a skilled tactician and was a severe blow to Japanese morale.
- Jisaburō Ozawa was an admiral in the Imperial Japanese Navy, commander of the Japanese forces in the Battle of the Philippine Sea in June 1944. He was the last commander-in-chief of the Japanese fleet.
- Tadamichi Kuribayashi was commander of Japanese forces who was killed at the battle of Iwo Jima.
- Isamu Yokoyama was commander of Japanese forces in China.
- Shigeyoshi Inoue was commander of Japanese forces at the Battle of the Coral Sea.
- Korechika Anami was an army general who served as war minister at the time of the Japanese surrender.
- Masakazu Kawabe was the commander of Japanese forces in Northern Burma and Western Yunnan.
- Prince Yasuhiko Asaka was a general in the army. He commanded the attack at Nanjing.
- Yasuji Okamura was commander in chief of the China Expeditionary Army from 1944 until the end of the war.
- Shunroku Hata was commander of Japanese forces during the Zhejiang-Jiangxi campaign. He was tried with war crimes and sentenced to life imprisonment after the war, but was paroled in 1954. He took command of Hiroshima after the bombing of the city.
- Harukichi Hyakutake was an army general who commanded the Japanese 17th Army at the Battle for Henderson Field.

== Romania ==
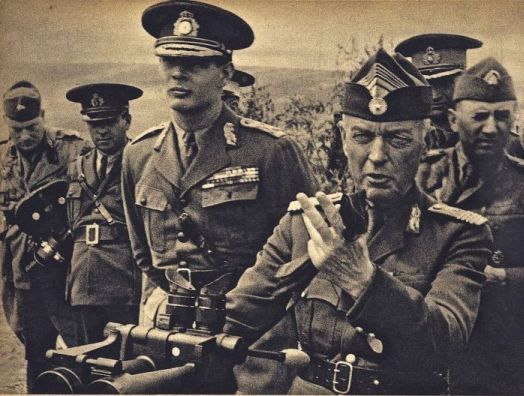
King Michael I (left) and Ion Antonescu (right)

- Ion Antonescu was the Prime Minister of Romania and the Conducător (Leader) with dictatorial powers from 1940 to 1944. He was sentenced to death and executed in 1946.
- Michael I was King from 1940 until 1947. He was installed by Antonescu to replace Michael's father Carol II. He did not have much power. He led a coup to overthrow Antonescu and switched sides to the Allies in 1944. He died in 2017.
- Ion Gigurtu was the Prime Minister of Romania from July to September 1940, right before Antonescu. A committed Germanophile, he took the first major steps for the integration of Romania into the Axis, including the withdrawal of Romania from the League of Nations (11 July) and the enacting of a local version of the Nuremberg Laws (9 August).
- Carol II was King from 1930 to 1940. He named Gigurtu and then Antonescu as Prime Ministers, being forced to resign by the latter after giving him dictatorial powers.
- Constantin Sănătescu was the prime minister 1944.
- Nicolae Rădescu was the prime minister 1944–45.
- Petre Dumitrescu commanded the Romanian Third Army on its campaign against the Soviet Union.
- Constantin Constantinescu-Claps commanded the Romanian Fourth Army.
- Emanoil Ionescu commanded the Royal Romanian Air Force.
- Ermil Gheorghiu commanded the Royal Romanian Air Force.
- Horia Macellariu commanded the Royal Romanian Navy.
- Horia Sima was head of the pro-Nazi "government in exile".

== German client states and protectorates ==
=== Slovak Republic ===
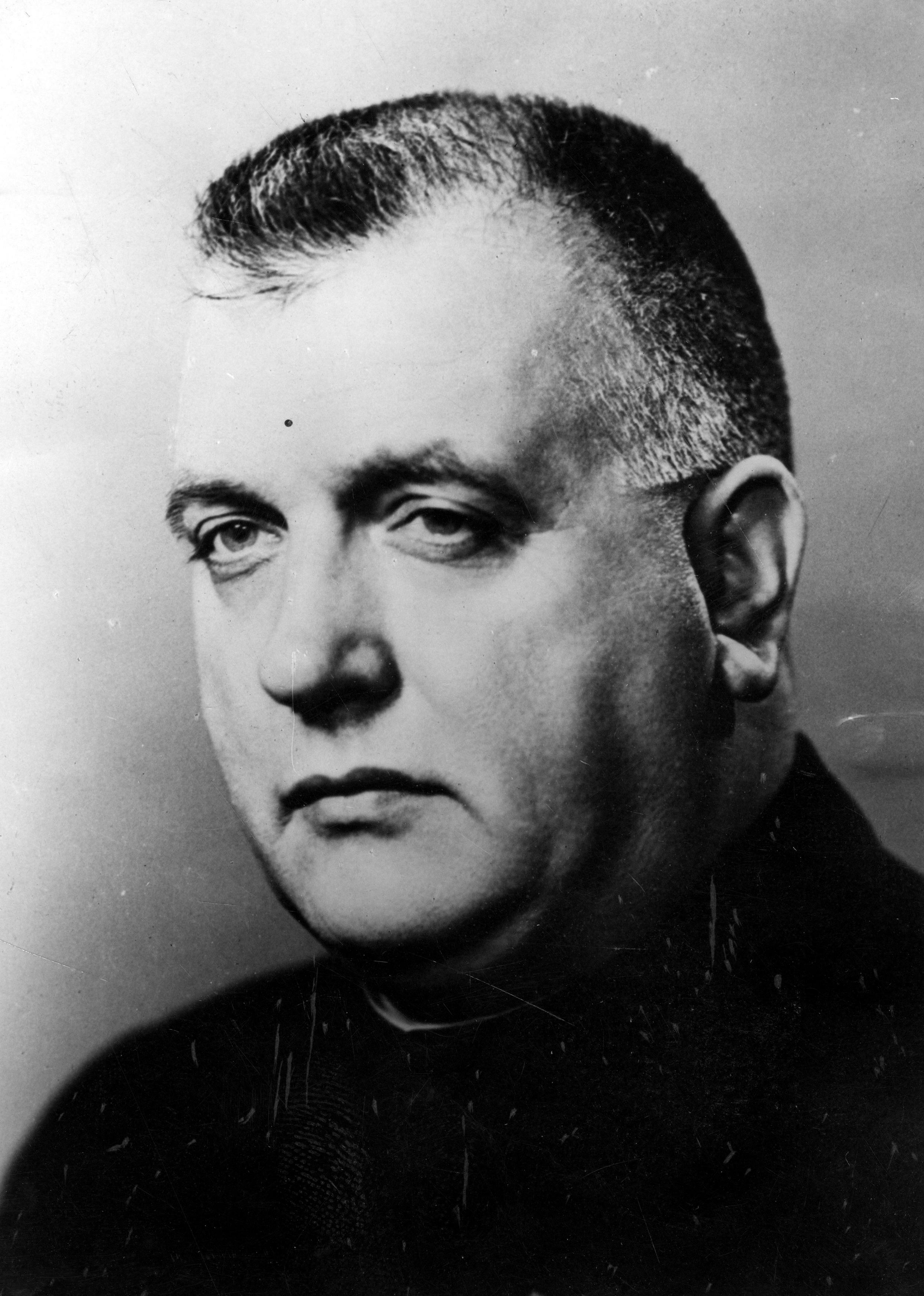
Jozef Tiso

- Jozef Tiso, President of the Slovak Republic.
- Vojtech Tuka, prime minister.
- Ferdinand Čatloš was commander of the Field Army Bernolák during the Invasion of Poland.
- Rudolf Pilfousek was commander of the SS-Heimatschutz Slowakei.
- Augustín Malár
- Ján Golian
- Otomar Kubala
- Štefan Tiso
- Karol Sidor
- Štefan Haššík

=== French State ===
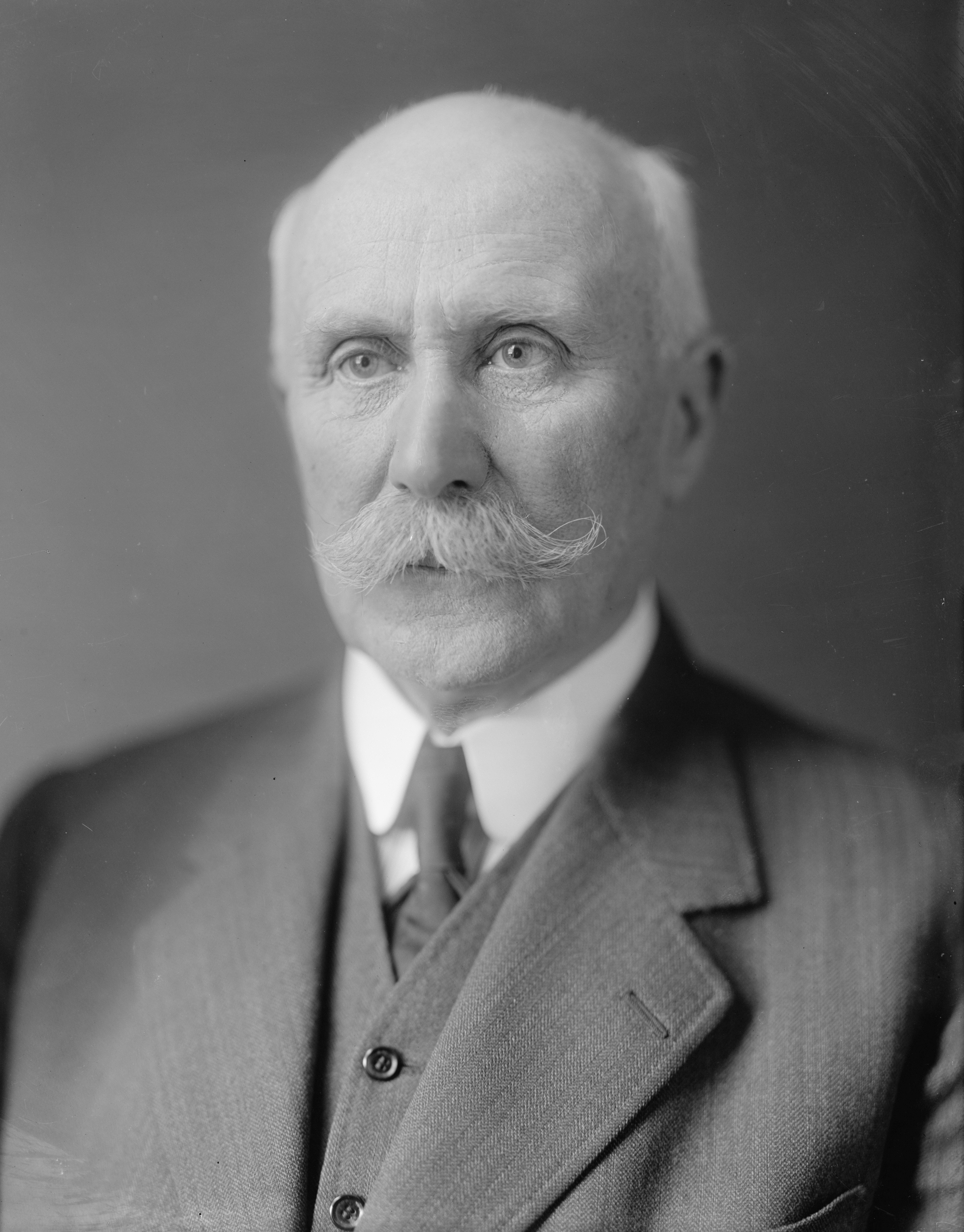
Philippe Pétain

- Philippe Pétain was an Army Marshal and Chief of State of Vichy France from its establishment in 1940 until the invasion of Normandy in 1944. The Pétain government collaborated with the Nazis, and organized raids to capture French Jews. The Pétain government was opposed by General de Gaulle's Free French Forces, and eventually fell to them. After the war, Pétain was tried for treason and sentenced to death, later changed to life in prison for his role in World War I, where he died in 1951.
- Pierre Laval was Pétain's head of government in 1940, and from 1942 to 1944. Under his second government, collaboration with Nazi Germany intensified. In 1945, Laval was tried for treason, sentenced to death and executed.
- René Bousquet was the deputy head of the Vichy police force.
- Joseph Darnand was the commander of the paramilitary French Militia. A pro-Nazi leader, he was a strong supporter of the Hitler and Pétain governments. He established the Milice to round-up Jews and fight the French Resistance. He was tried for treason and executed after the war.
- Jean Decoux was the Governor-General of French Indochina representing the Vichy government. Decoux's task in Indochina was to reverse the policy of appeasement towards the Japanese led by his predecessor General Georges Catroux, but political realities soon forced him to continue down the same road. Arrested and tried after the war, Decoux was not convicted.

=== Protectorate of Denmark ===
- Leonhard Kaupisch, Military commander of Denmark.
- Werner Best, served as a civilian administrator in Denmark.
- Erik Scavenius, Prime minister of Denmark from 1942 to 1943. He pursued a collaborative policy with the German occupation force until he dissolved the Danish government in 1943, and was replaced by German martial law.
- Frits Clausen, National Socialist Workers' Party of Denmark
- Christian Peder Kryssing, was commander of the Free Corps Denmark.
- Christian Frederik von Schalburg, was commander of the Free Corps Denmark.
- Knud Børge Martinsen, was commander of the Schalburg Corps.

== German puppet states ==
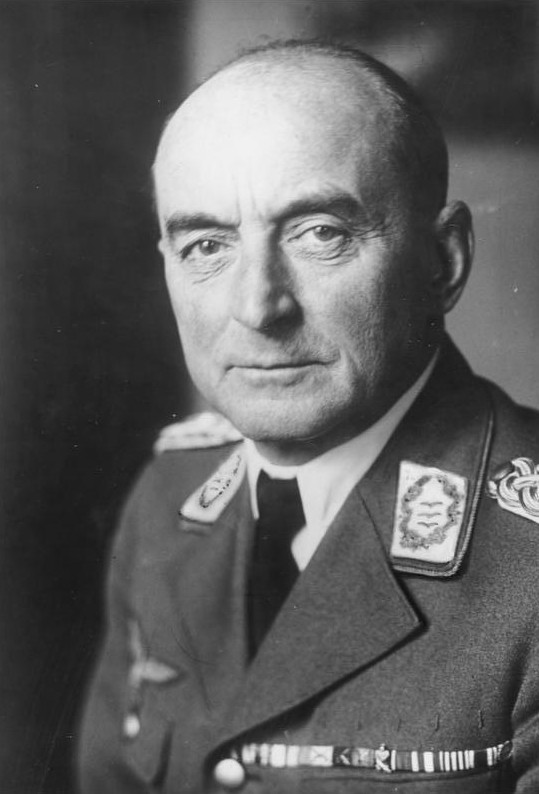
Leonhard Kaupisch

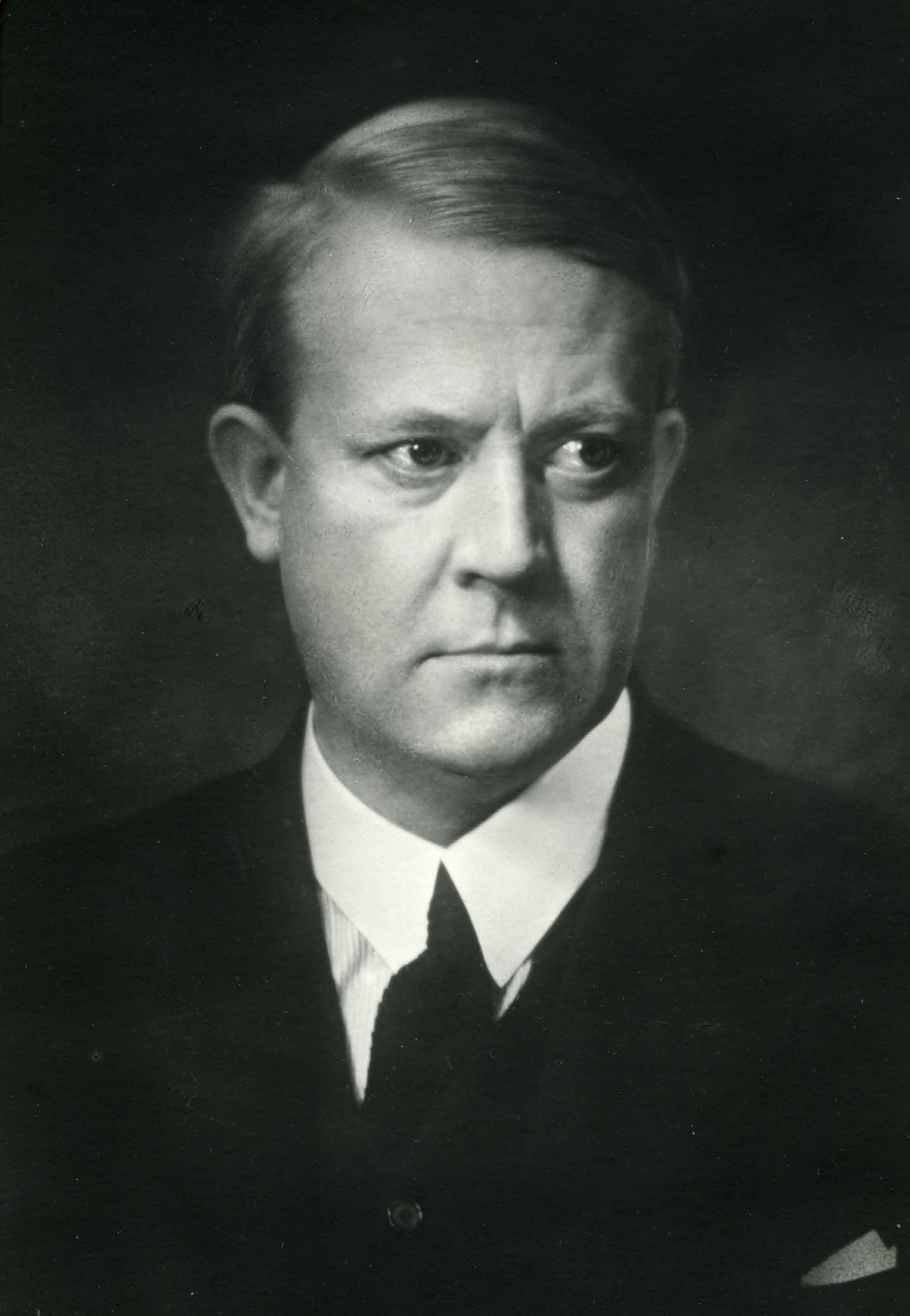
Vidkun Quisling

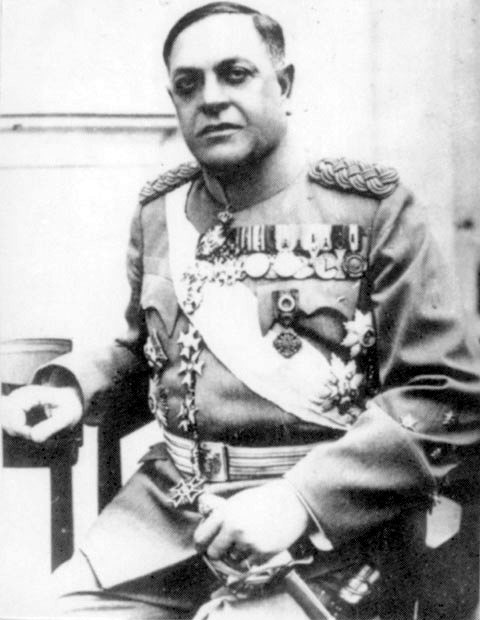
Milan Nedić

=== Province of Ljubljana ===
- Leon Rupnik, was the President of the provincial government.
- Gregorij Rožman,
- Ernest Peterlin, Battle of Turjak Castle

=== Norwegian National government ===
- Vidkun Quisling, Minister-President of the Norwegian national government from 1942 to 1945.
- Kjeld Stub Irgens
- Ragnar Skancke
- Sverre Riisnæs
- Jonas Lie, Minister of Police and SS-Standartenführer of the Germanic-SS Norway.
- Karl Marthinsen, General of Police, head of Norwegian STAPO (Statspolitiet) and SIPO (Sikkerhetspolitiet). He was assassinated by the resistance in 1945 due to increasing power and influence over the Norwegian military.
- Sophus Kahrs, was commander of the SS Ski Jäger Battalion "Norwegen".
- Arthur Qvist, was commander of the Norwegian Legion.

=== Government of National Salvation, Serbia ===
- Milan Nedić, general and Prime Minister of the Government of National Salvation.
- Milan Aćimović, minister of Internal Affairs of the Government of National Salvation
- Dimitrije Ljotić, president and leader of Zbor and ideological leader of Serbian Volunteer Corps.
- Dragomir Jovanović, was commander of the Serbian State Guard.
- Kosta Mušicki, was commander of the Serbian Volunteer Corps.
- Kosta Pećanac, was commander of the Pećanac Chetniks.
- Strahinja Janjić, was commander of the 1st Belgrade Special Combat detachment.

== Italian puppet states ==
=== Albanian Kingdom ===
- Shefqet Vërlaci, Prime Minister of the Albanian Kingdom.
- Tefik Mborja, Albanian Fascist Party

=== Kingdom of Montenegro ===
- Sekula Drljević was founder of the Montenegrin Federalist Party and Prime Minister of the Kingdom of Montenegro until his imprisonment in 1941.
- Blažo Đukanović was later military leader of Montenegro, as head of the Central Nationalist Committee, from 1942 to 1943.
- Pavle Đurišić was commander of the Montenegrin Volunteer Corps.
- Krsto Popović was commander of the Lovćen Brigade.

== Joint German–Italian puppet states ==
=== Hellenic State ===
- Georgios Tsolakoglou was Prime Minister of the Greek collaborationist government from April 30, 1941, to December 2, 1942.
- Konstantinos Logothetopoulos was prime minister from December 2, 1942, to April 7, 1943.
- Ioannis Rallis was prime minister from April 7, 1943, to October 12, 1944.
- Georgios Bakos Minister of Defence.

=== Independent State of Croatia ===
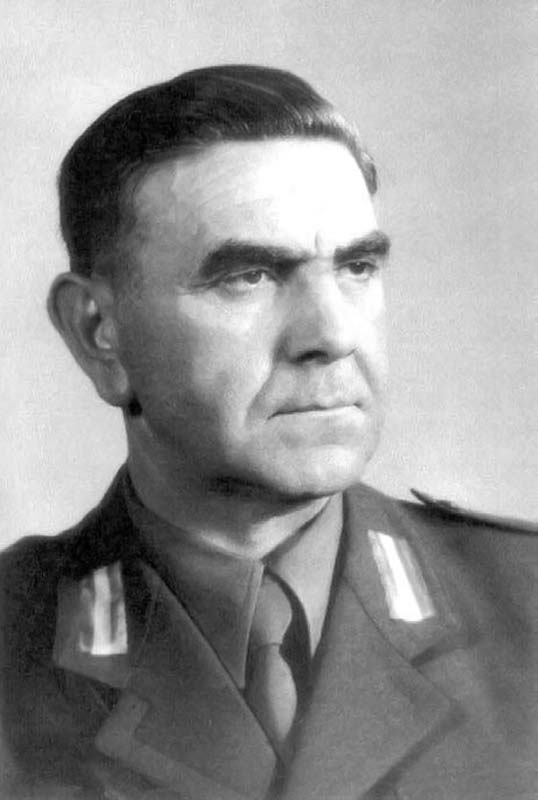
Ante Pavelić

- Ante Pavelić, Headman (Poglavnik) of the Independent State of Croatia (NDH) from 1941 to 1945.
- Tomislav II, the Italian-born King of Croatia.
- Nikola Mandić, prime minister under Pavelić from 1943 to 1945.
- Mladen Lorković, the Foreign Minister and Minister of the Interior of the Independent State of Croatia (NDH)
- Slavko Kvaternik, Minister of Defense.
- Vladimir Laxa, Army Chief of Staff.
- Vladimir Kren, was the commander of the Air Force of the Independent State of Croatia.
- Edgar Angeli, was the commander of the Navy of the Independent State of Croatia.
- Vjekoslav Luburić, was the commander of the Croatian Armed Forces.
- Jure Francetić, was the commander of the Black Legion.
- Marko Mesić, was the commander of the Croatian Legion.
- Andro Vrkljan, was the commander of the Croatian Naval Legion.
- Miroslav Navratil was a general and Minister of the Armed Forces between 1943-44.

== Japanese puppet states ==
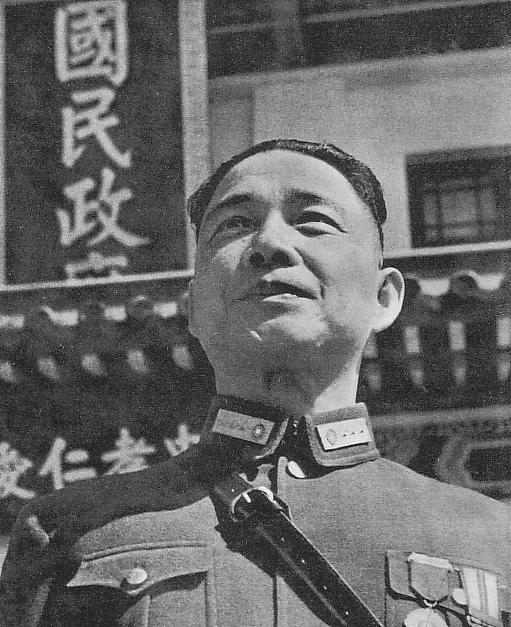
Chairman Wang Jingwei

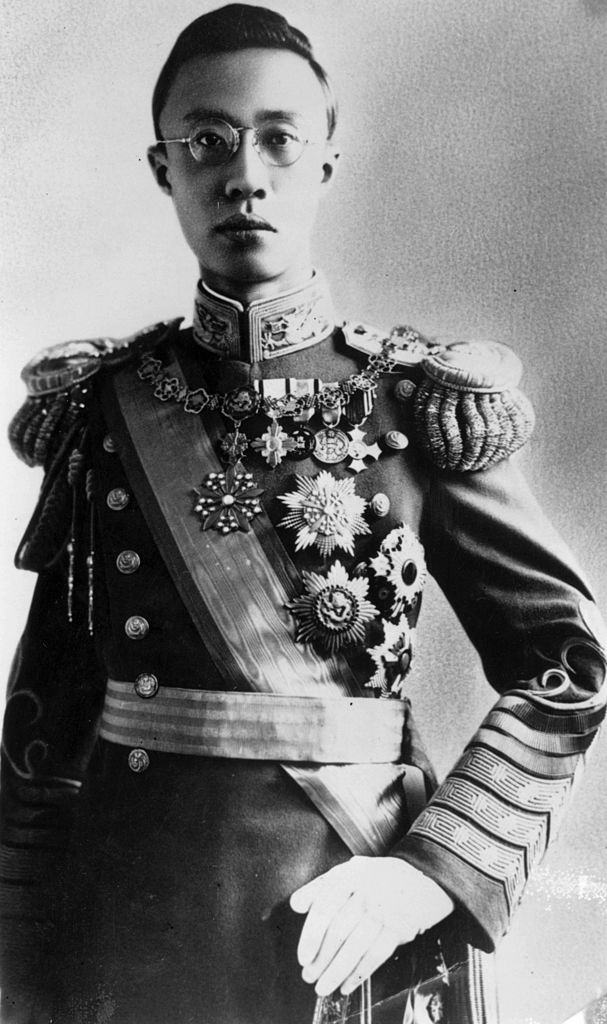
Emperor Puyi (Kangde)

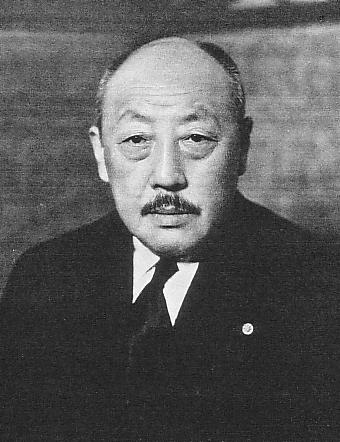
Zhang Jinghui

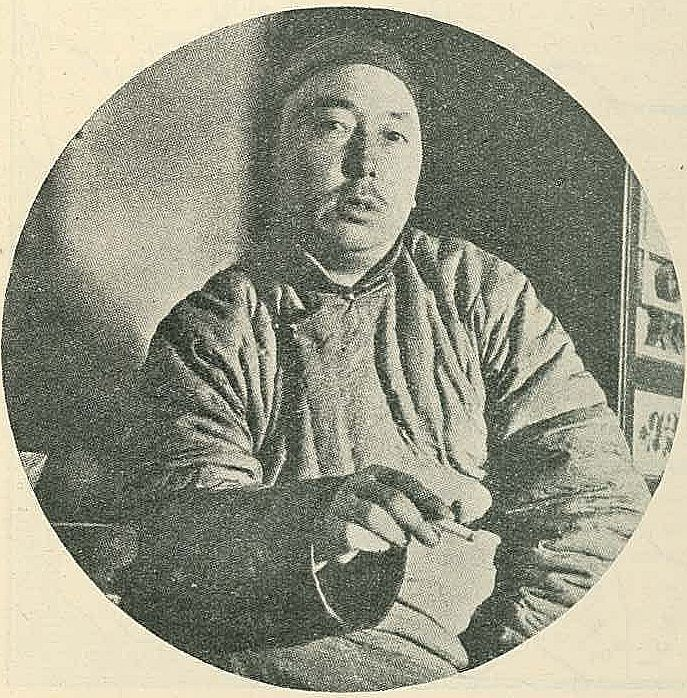
Chairman Demchugdongrub

=== State of Burma ===
- Ba Maw, political leader.

=== Kingdom of Cambodia ===
- Sisowath Monivong was the King from 1927 until his death in 1941.
- Norodom Sihanouk was the King following Monivong's death.
- Son Ngoc Thanh, prime minister.

=== Republic of China-Nanjing ===
- Wang Jingwei, Head of State, President of the Executive Yuan and Chairman of the National Government, officially known as the Republic of China.
- Chen Gongbo, Head of the Legislative Yuan.
- Zhou Fohai, Head of the Executive Yuan.

=== Provisional Government of Free India ===
- Subhas Chandra Bose, Head of State, The Prime Minister and the Minister for War and Foreign Affairs of the Free India government.

=== Kingdom of Laos ===
- Phetsarath Ratanavongsa, prime minister from 1942 to 1945 and vice-king.

=== Manchukuo ===
- Puyi was the Chief Executive and later Emperor of Manchukuo from 1932 until the disestablishment of the state in 1945. He was installed by the Japanese after the Invasion of Manchuria. He was captured and imprisoned by the Soviet Union, and later handed over to the People's Republic of China.
- Zhang Jinghui was the Prime Minister of Manchukuo. Zhang was a Chinese general and politician during the Warlord Era who collaborated with the Japanese to establish Manchukuo. After the war, he was captured and imprisoned by the Red Army.
- Xi Qia was the finance superintendent of Manchukuo in 1932, a minister of Manchukuo in 1934, and palace and interior minister in 1936. At the end of World War II he was captured by the Soviets and held in a Siberian prison until he was returned to China in 1950, where he died in prison.
- Chang Hai-peng, general of the Manchukuo Imperial Army.

=== Mengjiang ===
- Demchugdongrub was the vice-chairman, then the chairman. In 1941 he became chairman of the Mongolian Autonomous federation.
- Li Shouxin

=== Second Philippine Republic ===
- José P. Laurel, President.

=== Empire of Vietnam ===
- Bảo Đại was the King of Annam from 1926 until 1945 and Emperor of Vietnam from 1945 until 1949.
- Tran Trong Kim, prime minister.

== Co-belligerents ==
The following countries fought side by side with the Axis powers for a common cause. These countries were not signatories of the Tripartite Pact and thus not formal members of the Axis.

=== Finland ===
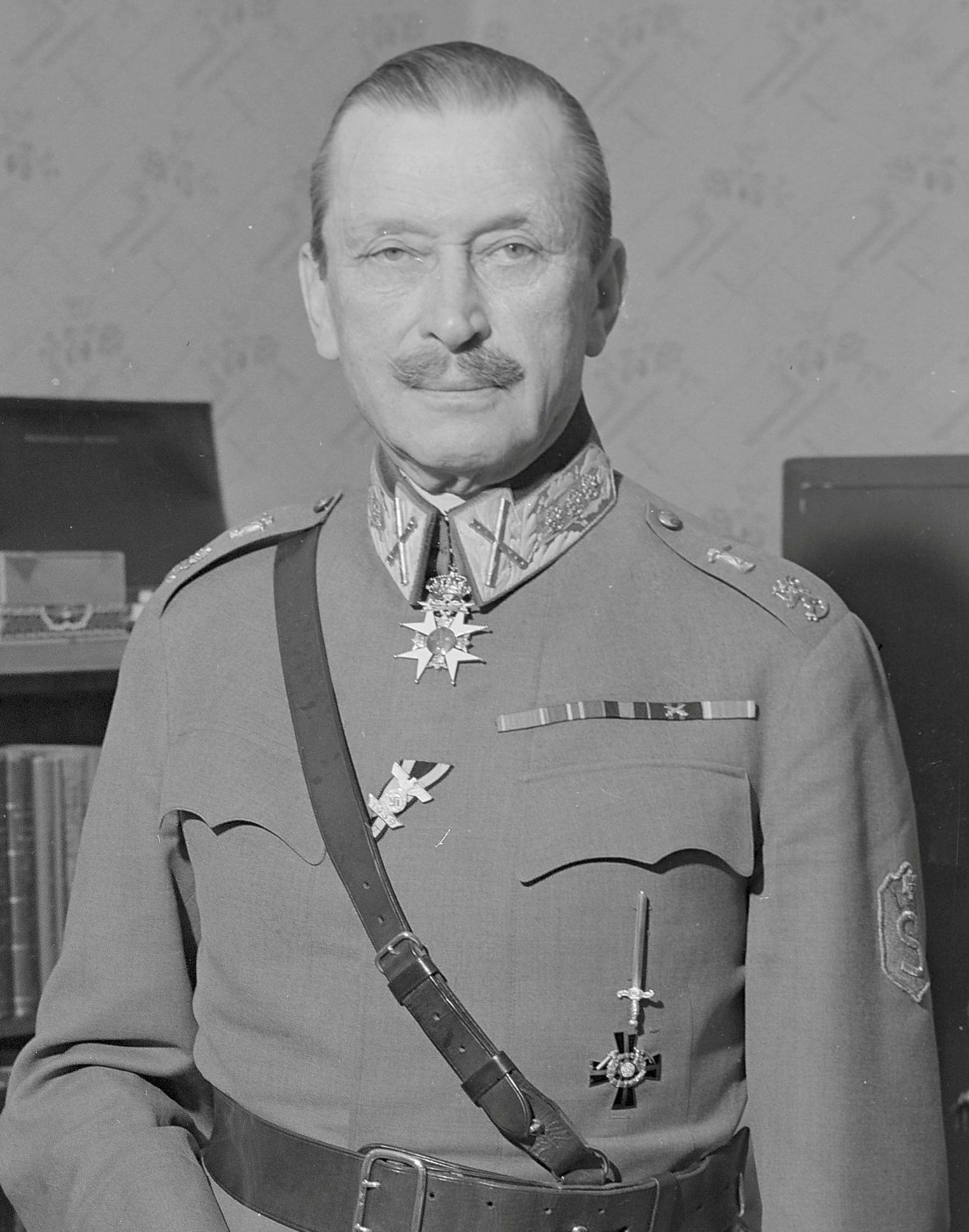
Carl Gustaf Emil Mannerheim

- Carl Gustaf Emil Mannerheim was the commander-in-chief of the Finnish Defense Forces and a Marshal of Finland.
- Kyösti Kallio was the 4th President of Finland.
- Risto Ryti was 5th President of Finland and the 14th Prime Minister of Finland.
- Johan Wilhelm Rangell was the Prime Minister of Finland 1941–1943.
- Eric Heinrichs commanded the Army of Karelia during the Continuation War.
- Karl Lennart Oesch commanded the Army of Karelia and during the trench warfare phase of the Continuation War.
- Jarl Lundqvist commanded the Finnish Air Force during the Continuation War.
- Väinö Valve commanded the Finnish Navy during the Continuation War.

=== Iraq ===
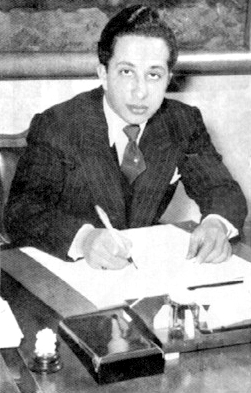
Faisal II

- Faisal II of Iraq was King of Iraq
- Rashid Ali al-Kaylani was Prime Minister of Iraq in 1940 and 1941. He overthrew the pro-British Nuri Said Pasha and established an anti-British regime. Britain responded with severe economic sanctions against Iraq and an invasion. The Anglo-Iraqi War ended with a British victory and Ali al-Kaylani out of power.
- Haj Amin al-Husseini was the Grand Mufti of Jerusalem who had been exiled from the British Mandate of Palestine for his nationalist activities. Husseini issued a 'fatwa' for a holy war against British rule in May 1941. The Mufti's widely heralded proclamation against Britain was declared in Iraq, where he was instrumental in the anti-British Iraqi revolt.

=== Thailand ===
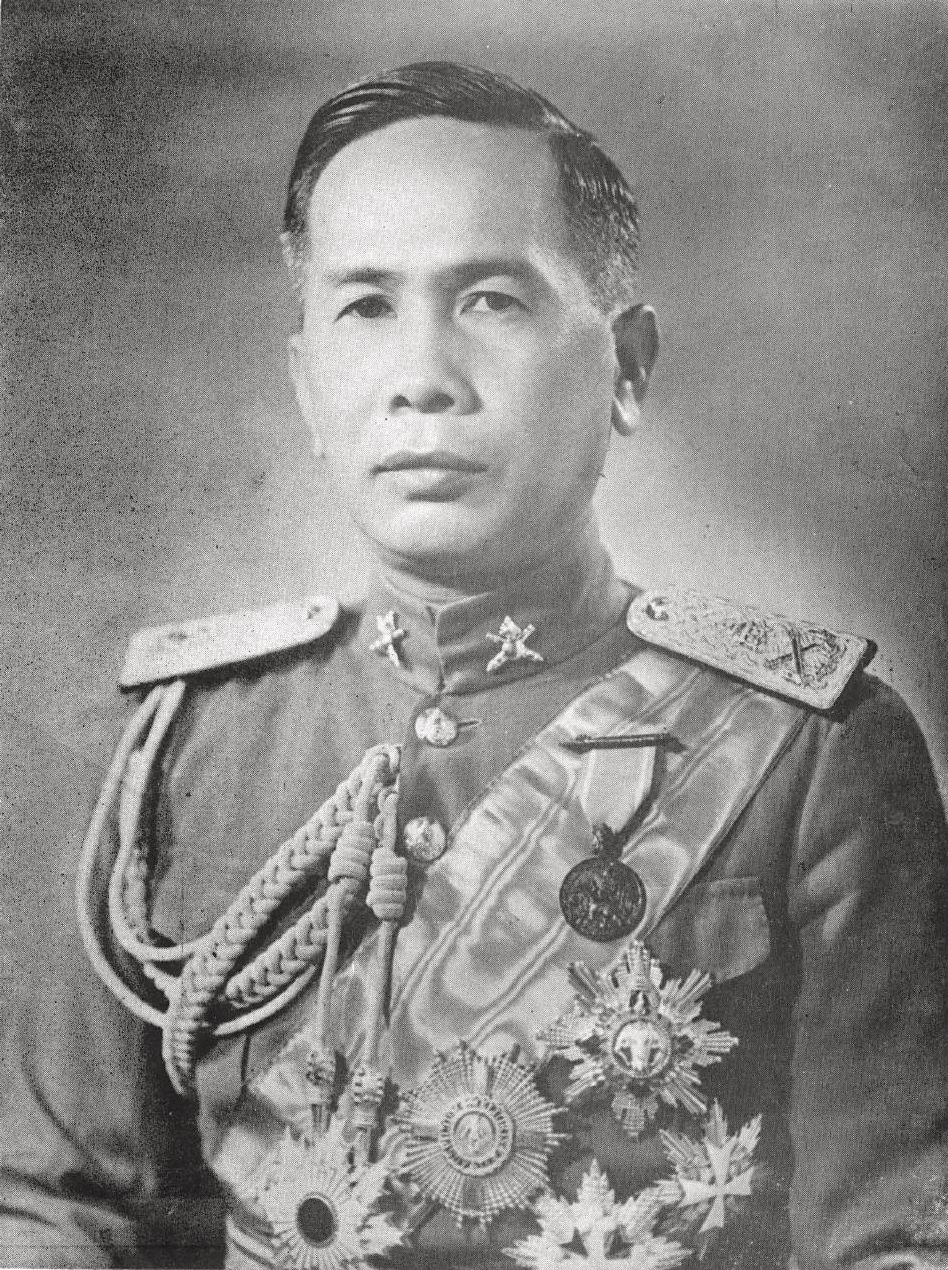
Plaek Phibunsongkhram

- Ananda Mahidol was King of Thailand from 1935 until his assassination in 1946. During the war, Mahidol stayed in neutral Switzerland. He returned to Thailand in 1945 after the war.
- Plaek Phibunsongkhram was Field Marshal of the Thai Army and was Prime Minister of Thailand from 1938 until 1944. The Pibulsonggram regime embarked upon a course of economic nationalism and anti-Chinese policies. In 1940, he decided to invade Indo-China in hostilities known as the French-Thai War. In 1941, he allied Thailand with Japan and allowed it to use the country for the invasions of Burma and Malaya. When Japanese defeat was imminent, he was pressured to resign in 1944.
- Charun Rattanakun Seriroengrit was a general who commanded Phayap Army that occupied the Shan State of British Burma.
- Phin Choonhavan commanded the Phayap Army 's 3rd Division before being made military governor of the Shan States
- Pridi Banomyong a former revolutionary and cabinet minister, was appointed to the regency council in 1941. By 1944, he became sole Regent and de facto Head of State, but this position was only nominal. He secretly became leader of the resistance forces or the Free Thai Movement in 1942.
- Khuang Aphaiwong, Prime Minister of Thailand, 1944–45.
