= Štefan Haššík =

Slovak politician

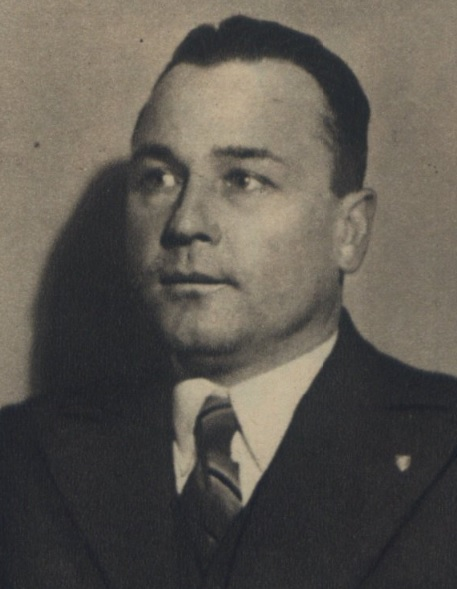
- Haššík in 1939

Minister of Defense
- In office 5 September 1944 – 4 April 1945
- Preceded by: Ferdinand Čatloš
- Succeeded by: Office abolished

Personal details
- Born: November 25, 1898; Dlhé Pole
- Died: 1985; Cleveland

Štefan Haššík (25 November 1898, Dlhé Pole — August 1985, Cleveland) was a Slovak politician who was the Minister of Defense of the Slovak State from 5 September 1944, replacing Ferdinand Čatloš who supported the Slovak National Uprising. He was sentenced to death in absentia, but fled after the war.
