= League of Diet Members Supporting the Prosecution of the Holy War =

Japanese political party coalition

The League of Diet Members Supporting the Prosecution of the Holy War (聖戦貫徹議員連盟, Seisen Kantetsu Giin Renmei) was a political party coalition in the lower house of the Diet of Japan formed on March 25, 1940, with the backing of the Imperial Japanese Army as a reaction against a speech made by Saitō Takao, of the Rikken Minseitō critical of the government's aggressive policies in the Second Sino-Japanese War.

The official establishment took measures, including setting up this group, and attempted to censor public "doubting". The speaker was censured in Parliament, and expelled from the chamber (and from his own party), to make an example. Its membership comprised a total of 250 active members in the lower house, which represented all political parties of the period. This grouping pushed for its members to be considered as "loyal" politicians in the militarists cause, differing from Saitō, who was accused of being a traitor to nation and the real values of the country.

The grouping published an open declaration: "We welcome the four years of sacred campaigning, in which the gallant actions of our soldiers, with the zeal and support of the people on the home front, have aimed to deliver a fatal blow to the corrupt Chiang Kai-shek regime, and have created within the Chinese masses a sentiment in favour of Japan and desires of peace."

This temporary grouping played into the hands of Prime Minister Fumimaro Konoe, whose efforts to create a one-party state were buoyed by a willingness of senior leaders of the traditional political parties to dissolve their own parties into a new organization headed by Konoe, provided that he would be able to moderate the extremism of the radicals, but still satisfy the demands of the military. The League was formally disbanded on June 11, 1940.

== See also ==
- National Spiritual Mobilization Movement
- Taisei Yokusankai
- Hakko ichiu
