= National Spiritual Mobilization Movement =

Japanese wartime economic tool (1937–45)

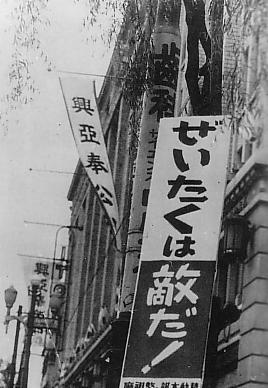
"Luxury is the Enemy" banner by the National Spiritual Mobilization Movement

The National Spiritual Mobilization Movement (國民精󠄀神󠄀總動員運動, Kokumin Seishin Sōdōin Undō; Shinjitai: 国民精神総動員運動) was an organization established in the Empire of Japan as part of the controls on civilian organizations under the National General Mobilization Law by Prime Minister Fumimaro Konoe.

Representatives from 74 nationalist organizations were assembled at the Prime Minister's residence in October 1937, and were told that their organizations were now part of the "Central League of the Spiritual Mobilization Movement", headed by Admiral Ryokitsu Arima and under the joint supervision of the Ministry of Home Affairs and Ministry of Education. The purpose of the Movement would be to rally the nation for a total war effort against China in the Second Sino-Japanese War.

Konoe later ordered another 19 nationalist organizations to join the League. This movement and other policies were part of "New Order" (Shintaisei) which was promulgated on 3 November 1938, a holiday marking emperor Meiji's birthday.

Apart from public calls for increased patriotism, the National Spiritual Mobilization Movement spanned some concrete programs like Boosting Production service to the Nation, Increasing Crops Service to the Nation and Student Volunteers Corps Service to the Nation. It was moreover part of a general move made by the Shōwa regime to closely control the information which had begun in 1936 with the establishment of the Cabinet Information Committee which launched two official magazines: the Shūhō (Weekly Report) in November 1936 and the Shashin Shūhō (Photographic Weekly Report). The purpose of these was "to ensure that the content and purport of the policies inaugurated by the Government are widely disseminated to the general citizenry and correctly understood by them".

Konoe's successor, Prime Minister Hiranuma Kiichirō, turned the movement over to General Sadao Araki in January 1939, who revitalized it by having it sponsor public rallies, radio programs, printed propaganda and discussion seminars at tonarigumi neighborhood associations. Famous public figures were recruited to provide lectures on the virtues of thrift, hygiene and hard work, and to disseminate a sense of national pride in the Japanese kokutai.

The League was abolished on 20 December 1945 by the American occupation authorities after the surrender of Japan.

== See also ==
- League of Diet Members Believing the Objectives of the Holy War
- Imperial Rule Assistance Association
