= Dlhé Pole =

Village and municipality in Slovakia

- Municipality
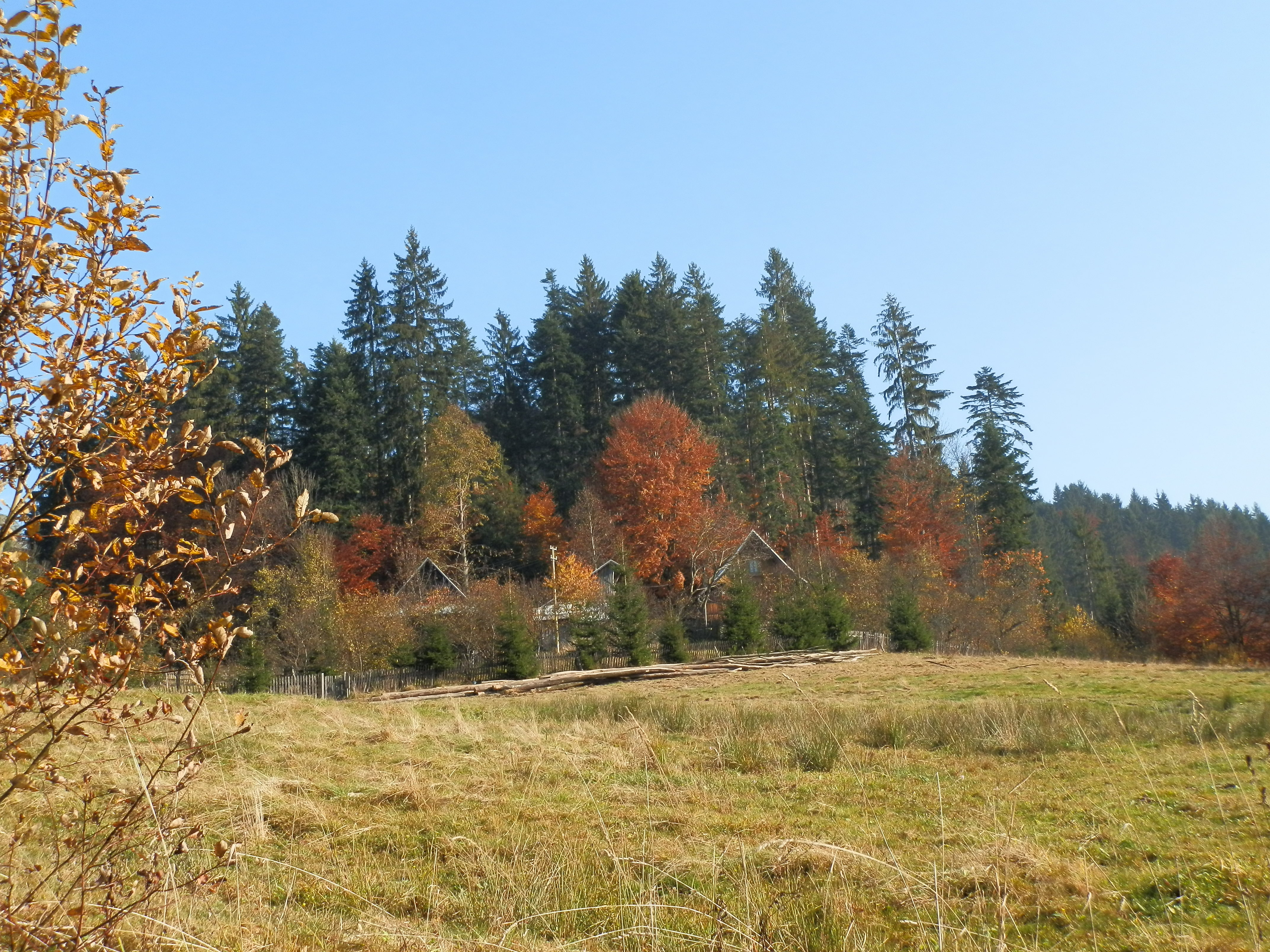

- Flag Coat of arms

- Location of Dlhé Pole in the Žilina Region Location of Dlhé Pole in Slovakia
- Coordinates: 49.30°N 18.63°E
- Country: Slovakia
- Region: Žilina Region
- District: Žilina District
- First mentioned: 1320

Area
  - Total: 41.02 km^{2} (15.84 sq mi)
- Elevation: 536 m (1,759 ft)

Population (2025)
  - Total: 1,956
- Time zone: UTC+1 (CET)
  - Summer (DST): UTC+2 (CEST)
- Postal code: 133 2
- Area code: +421 41
- Vehicle registration plate (until 2022): ZA
- Website: www.obecdlhepole.sk

Dlhé Pole (Hungarian: Trencsénhosszúmező) is a village and municipality in Žilina District in the Žilina Region of northern Slovakia.

== History ==
In historical records the village was first mentioned in 1320. In 1385, it was referred as Langenfelt vel Dlwhe Pole, in 1796 as Hosszú Mező/Dluhe Pole. Until 1899, it was officially called as Dlhepole, when it was renamed as Trencsénhosszúmező.

== Geography ==
The municipality lies at an altitude of 536 metres (1,759 ft) and covers an area of 41.02 km^{2} (15.84 sq mi) (2025).

== Population ==
Population statistic (10 years)
Year	1995	2005	2015	2025
Count	2147	2032	1917	1956
Difference		−5.35%	−5.65%	+2.03%

Population statistic
Year	2024	2025
Count	1939	1956
Difference		+0.87%

It has a population of 1956 people (31 December 2025).

=== Ethnicity ===
Census 2021 (1+ %)
Ethnicity	Number	Fraction
Slovak	1900	98.03%
Not found out	34	1.75%
Total	1938	

In year 2021 was 1938 people by ethnicity 1900 as Slovak, 34 as Not found out, 19 as Czech, 2 as Russian, 2 as Other, 1 as Ukrainian, 1 as Romani, 1 as German and 1 as Hungarian.

Note on population: The difference values of population numbers in the table "Population statistic" and in the sections "Ethnicity" & "Religion" is caused by the use of various statistical methods.

=== Religion ===
Census 2021 (1+ %)
Religion	Number	Fraction
Roman Catholic Church	1631	84.16%
None	204	10.53%
Not found out	34	1.75%
Total	1938	

In year 2021 was 1938 people by religion 1631 from Roman Catholic Church, 204 from None, 34 from Not found out, 15 from Evangelical Church, 9 from Ad hoc movements, 8 from Christian Congregations in Slovakia, 8 from Other, 7 from Calvinist Church, 5 from Greek Catholic Church, 4 from Paganism and natural spirituality, 3 from Eastern Orthodox Church, 2 from Other and not ascertained christian church, 2 from Jehovah's Witnesses, 2 from Church of Jesus Christ of Latter-day Saints, 1 from Jewish community, 1 from Czechoslovak Hussite Church, 1 from Church of the Brethren and 1 from Buddhism.

== Genealogical resources ==
The records for genealogical research are available at the state archive "Statny Archiv in Bytca, Slovakia"

- Roman Catholic church records (births/marriages/deaths): 1690-1905 (parish A))

== See also ==
- List of municipalities and towns in Slovakia
